Taiwanese moths represent about 4,000 known moth species. The moths (mostly nocturnal) and butterflies (mostly diurnal) together make up the taxonomic order Lepidoptera.

This is a list of moth species which have been recorded in Taiwan.

Acrolepiidae
Acrolepiopsis brevipennella Moriuti, 1972
Digitivalva longipennella Moriuti, 1972

Adelidae
Nematopogon taiwanella KozLev, 2001
Nemophora aritai KozLev & Hirowatari, 1997
Nemophora askoldella (Milliere, 1879)
Nemophora decisella Walker, 1863
Nemophora issikii KozLev & Hirowatari, 1997
Nemophora lapikella KozLev, 1997b
Nemophora limenites (Meyrick, 1914)
Nemophora magnifica KozLev, 1997a
Nemophora polychorda (Meyrick, 1914)
Nemophora uncella KozLev, 1996

Agonoxenidae
Zaratha prosarista Meyrick, 1909

Alucitidae
Alucita spilodesma (Meyrick, 1908)

Amphisbatidae
Anchinia porphyritica Meyrick
Cryptolechia argometra Meyrick, 1935
Cryptolechia coriata Meyrick, 1914
Cryptolechia epistemon Strand, 1920
Cryptolechia fenerata Meyrick, 1914
Cryptolechia malacobrysa Meyrick, 1921
Cryptolechia metacentra Meyrick, 1914
Cryptolechia mitis Meyrick, 1914
Cryptolechia pelophaea Meyrick, 1931
Eutorna insidiosa Meyrick
Machimia guerneela de Joannis, 1914

Amphitheridae
Agriothera elaeocarpophaga Moriuti, 1978
Agriothera issikii Moriuti, 1978
Telethera blepharacma Meyrick, 1913
Telethera formosa Moriuti, 1978

Arctiidae
Aglaomorpha histrio (Miyake, 1907)
Agrgina astrea (Drury, 1773)
Agylla asakurana (Matsumura, 1931)
Agylla pulchristriata Kishida
Agylla virago Rothschild
Agylla virlis Rothschild
Amata edwardsii (Butler, 1876)
Amata flava (Wileman, 1910)
Amata formosensis (Wileman, 1928)
Amata forunei (Sonan, 1941)
Amata hirayamae Matsumura
Amata issikii (Sonan, 1941)
Amata lucerna (Wileman, 1910)
Amata nigrifrons Wileman
Amata perixanthia (Hampson, 1898)
Amata rantaisana (Sonan, 1941)
Amata shirakii (Sonan, 1941)
Amata t-nigra (Matsumura, 1931)
Amata wilemani Rothschild, 1911
Amerila astrea (Drury, 1773)
Amsacta lactinea (Cramer, 1777)
Amsactoides solitaria (Wileman, 1910)
Areas galactina Okano, 1960
Argina argus (Kollar, 1847)
Argyractia fuscobasalis (Matsumura, 1930)
Argyractia reikoae (Kishida, 1984)
Asura acteota Swinhoe
Asura albidorsalis Wileman
Asura alikangiae Strand
Asura arcuata (Moore, 1882)
Asura connexa (Wileman, 1910)
Asura striata Wileman
Asura strigipennis (Herrich-Schäffer, 1914)
Asura tricolor (Wileman, 1910)
Asura uniformeola Hampson
Asuridia rubripennis Inoue
Asurpopsis ranruna Matsumura
Brunia antica (Walker, 1854)
Caeneressa alikangiensis (Strand, 1915)
Caeneressa diaphana (Kollar, 1844)
Calpenia takamukui Matsumura
Chamaita hirta Wileman
Chamaita ranruna (Matsumura, 1927)
Chrysaeglia magnifica (Walker, 1862)
Chrysaeglia taiwana (Hampson, 1914)
Chrysorabdia taiwana Wileman
Chrysorabdia vilemani Hampson, 1911
Conilepia nigricosta Kishida, 1991
Creatonotos gangis (Linnaeus, 1763)
Creatonotos transiens (Walker, 1855)
Creatonotos vacillans Walker
Cyana effracta (Walker, 1854)
Cyana formosana (Hampson, 1909)
Cyana hamata (Walker, 1854)
Cyana posilla (Wileman, 1910)
Cyana propinqua (Wileman, 1910)
Cyana quadripartita (Wileman, 1910)
Cyana sanguinea (Bremer & Grey, 1852)
Cyana straminea (Hampson, 1914)
Cyana subalba (Wileman, 1910)
Diduga flavicostata (Snellen, 1878)
Eilema acutapex Strand
Eilema arizana Wileman
Eilema bicoloriceps Strand
Eilema costipuncta (Leech, 1890)
Eilema formosicola (Matsumura, 1927)
Eilema griseola (Hübner, 1803)
Eilema karenkona (Matsumura, 1927)
Eilema magnata (Matsumura, 1927)
Eilema obliquistria (Hampson, 1894)
Eilema pulverea Wileman
Eilema ranrunensis (Matsumura, 1927)
Eilema ratonella (Matsumura, 1927)
Eilema ratonis (Matsumura, 1927)
Eilema rubrescens (Hampson, 1909)
Eilema saitonis (Matsumura, 1927)
Eilema sakia (Matsumura, 1927)
Eilema serva (Walker, 1854)
Eilema subcosteol (Druce, 1899)
Eilema taiwana Wileman
Eilema taiwanella (Matsumura, 1927)
Eilema tecta Wileman
Eilema tomponis (Matsumura, 1927)
Eilema tricolor Wileman
Eilema usuguronis (Matsumura, 1927)
Eilema vensosa (Moore, 1878)
Eospilarctia formosana (Rothschild, 1933)
Eospilarctia nehallenia (Matsumura)
Eospilarctia neurographa (Hampson, 1909)
Eressa confinis (Wileman, 1910)
Euchromia elegantissima Butler
Eugoa bipunctata (Walker, 1862)
Eugoa brunnea Hampson, 1914
Eugoa formosibia Strand
Eugoa grisea Butler, 1877
Eugoa obscura Hampson
Eugoa sinuata Wileman
Garudinia simulana (Walker, 1863)
Ghoria bani Kishida, 2006
Ghoria subpurpurea (Matsumura, 1927)
Gymnasura semilutea (Wileman, 1911)
Heliosia alba Hampson
Hemipsilia coavestis (Hampson, 1894)
Hesudra divisa Moore, 1878
Hyposiccia punctigera (Leech, 1899)
Lemrya stigmata (Moore, 1865)
Lemyra alikangensis (Strand, 1915)
Lemyra fallaciosa (Matsumura, 1930)
Lemyra imparillis (Butler, 1877)
Lemyra infernalis (Butler, 1877)
Lemyra moltrechti (Miyake, 1909)
Lemyra nigricosta Thomas
Lemyra rhodophilodes (Hampson, 1909)
Lemyra wernerthomasi Inoue, 1993
Macaduma cretacea Hampson
Macrobrochis gigas (Walker, 1854)
Meteugoa japonica Strand
Meteugoa ochrivena (Hampson, 1898)
Miltochrista convexa Wileman
Miltochrista delineata (Walker, 1854)
Miltochrista dentata Wileman
Miltochrista fuscozonata Inoue
Miltochrista karenkonis Matsumura
Miltochrista koshunica Strand
Miltochrista sauteri Strand
Miltochrista takamukui Matsumura
Miltochrista ziczac (Walker, 1856)
Mithuna arizana Wileman
Nannoarctia integra (Walker, 1855)
Neasura gyochiana Matsumura
Neasura melanopyga (Hampson, 1918)
Neasura nigroanalis Matsumura
Neasuroides asakurai Matsumura
Neasuroides simplicior Matsumura
Neoblavia scoteola Hampson
Nikaea longipennis (Walker, 1855)
Nikaea matsumurai Kishida
Nikaeoides arisanus (Matsumura, 1911)
Nishada formosibia Matsumura
Notata parva Hampson
Nudaria suffusa Hampson
Nudina artxidia (Bulter, 1881)
Nyctemera adversata (Schaller, 1788)
Nyctemera albofasciata (Wileman, 1911)
Nyctemera arctata Walker 1856
Nyctemera baulus (Boisduval, 1832)
Nyctemera cenis (Cramer, 1777)
Nyctemera coleta (Stoll, 1781)
Nyctemera formosana (Swinhoe, 1908)
Nyctemera kotoshonis Matsumura
Nyctemera lacticinia (Cramer, 1777)
Oeonistis entella (Cramer, 1779)
Palaeopsis diaphanella Hampson, 1893
Palaeopsis squamifera Hampson
Paraona staudingeri Okano, 1960
Parasiccia dentata (Wileman, 1911)
Parasiccia fuscipennis Wileman
Parasiccia maculata (Poujade, 1886)
Parasiccia nebulosa Wileman
Parasiccia punctilinea Wileman
Paraspilarctia magna (Wileman, 1910)
Pelosia muscerda Hampson, 1900
Philenora latifasciata Inoue & Kobayashi
Pitasila brylancik (Bryk, 1937)
Pitasila fractifascia (Wileman, 1911)
Schistophleps bipuncta Hampson
Siccia fumeola Hampson
Siccia sordida (Bulter, 1877)
Siccia taiwana Wileman
Spilarctia alba (Matsumura, 1927)
Spilarctia clava (Wileman, 1910)
Spilarctia contaminata (Wileman, 1910)
Spilarctia fumida (Wileman, 1910)
Spilarctia nigrovittata (Matsumura, 1911)
Spilarctia postrubida (Wileman, 1910)
Spilarctia rubida (Leech, 1890)
Spilarctia subcarnea (Walker, 1855)
Spilarctia subtestacea (Rothschild, 1910)
Spilarctia taiwanensis (Matsumura, 1927)
Spilarctia tienmushana Kishida, 1991
Spilarctia wilemani (Rothschild, 1914)
Spilosoma daitoensis (Matsumura, 1930)
Stigmatophora flava (Bremer, 1852)
Stigmatophora palmata (Moore, 1878)
Stigmatophora tridens (Wileman, 1910)
Syntomoides imaon (Cramer, 1780)
Taicallimorpha albipuncta (Wileman, 1910)
Teulisna tumida (Walker, 1862)
Thysanoptyx incurvata (Wileman & West, 1928)
Tigrioides dimidiatus Matsumura
Tigrioides immaculatus (Butler, 1880)
Utetheisa lotrix (Cramer, 1777)
Utetheisa pulchelloides Hampson
Utetheisa vaga Jordan, 1939

Arrhenophanidae
Palaeophanes lativalva Davis, 2003
Palaeophanes taiwanensis Davis, 2003

Bedelliidae
Bedellia ipomoella Kuroko, 1982

Batrachedridae
Batrachedra arenosella (Walker, 1864)
Batrachedra pastor Meyrick, 1932

Blastobasidae
Blastobasis indirecta Meyrick, 1931
Blastobasis nephelophaea Meyrick, 1931
Blastobasis spermologa Meyrick, 1916
Coniogenes contempta Meyrick, 1936
Neoblastobasis decolor (Meyrick, 1907)

Bombycidae
Andraca olivacea Matsumura, 1927
Andraca theae (Matsumura, 1909)
Bombyx horsfieldi (Moore, 1860)
Bombyx mandarina (Matsumura, 1927)
Bombyx mori (Linnaeus, 1758)
Bombyx rotundapex Miyata & Kishida, 1990
Ernolatia moorei (Hutton, 1865)
Mustilia fusca Kishida, 1993
Mustilia sphingiformis gerontica West, 1932
Oberthueria formosibia Matsumura, 1927
Prismosticta fenestrata Butler, 1880
Trilocha varians (Walker, 1855)
Triuncina brunnea (Wileman, 1911)

Brachodidae
Miscera sauteri Kallies, 2004
Nigilgia limata Diakonoff & Arita, 1979
Paranigilgia busii (Arita, 1980)

Brahmaeidae
Brahmaea wallichii Inoue, 1984

Bucculatricidae
Bucculatrix eremospora Meyrick, 1935
Bucculatrix hypocypha Meyrick, 1936

Callidulidae
Callidula attenuata (Moore, 1879)
Pterodecta felderi (Bremer, 1864)
Tetragonus catamitus Geyer, 1832

Carposinidae
Heterogymna ochrogramma Meyrick, 1913
Meridarchis concinna Meyrick, 1913
Meridarchis jumboa Kawabe, 1980
Metacosmesis aelinopa Diakonoff, 1982

Choreutidae
Anthophila halimora (Meyrick, 1912)
Benthia moriutii Arita, 1987
Benthia yaeyamae Arita, 1971
Brenthia formosensis Issiki, 1930
Choreutis achyrodes (Meyrick, 1912)
Choreutis amethystodes (Meyrick, 1914)
Choreutis basalis (Felder & Rogenhofer, 1875)
Choreutis diplogramma (Meyrick, 1912)
Choreutis fulminea Meyrick, 1912
Choreutis hyligenes (Butler, 1879)
Choreutis ophiosema (Lower, 1896)
Choreutis orthogona (Meyrick, 1886)
Choreutis semicincta (Meyrick, 1921)
Choreutis sexfasciella (Sauber, 1902)
Choreutis xanthogramma (Meyrick, 1912)
Choreutis yakushimensis (Marumo, 1923)
Litobrenthia grammodes Diakonoff, 1979
Litobrenthia stephanephora Diakonoff, 1979
Saptha angustistriata Issiki, 1930
Saptha beryllitis (Meyrick, 1910)
Saptha divitiosa Walker, 1864
Saptha pretiosa (Walker, 1866)

Coleophoridae
Coleophora citrarga Meyrick, 1934

Cosmopterigidae
Ashibusa jezoensis Matsumura, 1931
Balionebris bacteriota Meyrick, 1935
Cosmopterix attenuatella (Walker, 1864)
Cosmopterix brachyclina Meyrick, 1933
Cosmopterix issikiella Kuroko, 1957
Cosmopterix lienigiella Zeller, 1846
Labdia bitabulata Meyrick, 1935
Labdia citrama (Meyrick, 1915)
Labdia promacha (Meyrick, 1897)
Labdia semicoccinae (Stainton, 1859)
Metagrypa tetrarrhycha Meyrick, 1933
Passalotis irianthes Meyrick, 1932
Periscoptila leucosarca Meyrick, 1936
Placoptila semioceros (Meyrick, 1935)
Pyroderces nephelopyrrha (Meyrick, 1917)
Pyroderces simplex Walsingham, 1891
Rhadinastis serpula Meyrick, 1932
Stagmatophora leptarga Meyrick, 1914
Stagmatophora urantha Meyrick, 1914
Syntomaula simulatella (Walker, 1864)

Cossidae
Holcocerus vicarinus (Walker, 1865)
Phragmataecia castaneae (Huebner, 1790)
Phragmataecia cinnamomea Wileman, 1911
Phragmataecia fusca Wileman, 1911
Ratarda excellens (Strand, 1917)
Shisa excellens Strand, 1917
Squamura discipuncta (Wileman, 1915)
Xyleutes strix (Linnaeus, 1758)
Xyleutes unimaculosa (Matsumura, 1931)
Zeuzera coffeae Nietner, 1861
Zeuzera indica Herrich-Schaeffer, 1854
Zeuzera multistrigata Moore, 1881

Crambidae
Achyra massalis Walker, 1859
Achyra takowensis Maes, 1987
Acropentias aurea Butler, 1878
Aediodina quaternalis Lederer, 1863
Aethaloessa calidalis Guenee, 1854
Aetholix flavibasalis Guenée, 1863
Agassiziella hapilista (Swinhoe, 1892)
Agathodes ostentalis Geyer, 1837
Agrotera basinotata Hampson, 1891
Agrotera discinotata Swinhoe, 1894
Agrotera ornata Wileman & South, 1917
Agrotera scissalis Walker, 1866
Analthes contortalis Hampson, 1900
Analthes insignis Butler, 1881
Analthes semitritalis Lederer, 1863
Analthes taihokualis Strand, 1918
Anania pata (Strand, 1918)
Ancylolomia japonica Zeller, 1877
Angustalius malacelloides Błeszyński, 1955
Antalthes euryterminalis Hampson, 1918
Antigastra catalaunalis Duponchel, 1833
Ategumia adipalis Lederer, 1863
Autocharis amethystina Swinhoe, 1894
Bocchoris inspersalis Zeller, 1852
Botyodes asialis Guenee, 1854
Botyodes diniasalis Walker, 1859
Botyodes principalis Leech, 1889
Bradina atopalis Yamanaka, 1984
Bradina aulacodialis Strand, 1919
Bradina diagonalis Guenee, 1854
Bradina erilitoides Strand, 1919
Bradina geminalis Caradja, 1927
Bradina melanoperas Hampson, 1896
Calamotropha anticella Walker, 1866
Calamotropha baibarella Shibuya, 1928
Calamotropha caesella Walker, 1863
Calamotropha formosella Błeszyński, 1961
Calamotropha franki Caradja, 1931
Calamotropha paludella Hübner, [1824]
Calamotropha subterminella Wileman & South, 1917
Callibotys carapina Strand, 1918
Camptomastix hisbonalis Walker, 1859
Cangetta rectilinea Moore, 1886
Cataclysta angulata Moore, 1885
Ceratarcha umbrosa Swinhoe, 1894
Chabula acamasalis Walker, 1859
Chabula onychinalis Guenee, 1854
Chabula telphusalis Walker, 1859
Chabula trivitralis Swinhoe, 1895
Charltoniada apicenotata Hampson, 1919
Charltoniada difficilis Strand, 1919
Chilo auricilius Dudgeon, 1905
Chilo infuscatellus Snellen, 1890
Chilo pulveratus Wileman & South, 1927
Chilo sacchariphagus Bojer, 1856
Chilo suppressalis Walker, 1863
Chrysoteuchia sonobei Marumo, 1936
Circobotys aurealis Leech, 1889
Circobotys elegans Munroe & Mutuura, 1969
Circobotys elongata Munroe & Mutuura, 1969
Circobotys pallida Moore, 1888
Cirrhochrista bracteolalis Hampson, 1891
Cirrhochrista brizoalis Walker, 1859
Cirrhochrista fuscusa Chen, Song & Wu, 2006
Cirrhochrista kosemponialis Strand, 1919
Cirrhochrista spissalis (Guenee, 1854)
Clupeosoma cinereum Warren, 1892
Clupeosoma suffusum Walker, [1866]
Cnaphalocrocis medinalis Guenee, 1854
Cnaphalocrocis pauperalis (Strand, 1918)
Condega obscurata Moore, 1886
Condega syleptalis (Strand, 1918)
Conogethes parvipunctalis Inoue & Yamanaka, 2006
Conogethes pinicolalis Inoue & Yamanaka, 2006
Conogethes punctiferalis Guenee, 1854
Cotachena pubescens Warren, 1892
Cotachena taiwanalis Yamanaka, 2001
Crambostenia angustifimbrialis Swinhoe, 1890
Crambus kumatakellus Shibuya, 1928
Crambus narcissus Błeszyński, 1961
Crambus niitakaensis Marumo, 1936
Crambus tomanaellus Marumo, 1936
Crocidolomia binotalis Zeller, 1852
Crocidolomia suffusalis Hampson, 1891
Crypsiptya coclesalis (Walker, 1859)
Culladia admigratella Walker, 1863
Culladia hastiferalis Walker, [1866]
Cymoriza interruptalis Wileman & South, 1917
Cymoriza irrectalis Guenee, 1854
Cymoriza taiwanalis Shibuya, 1928
Daisemia calcaralis Strand, 1918
Daisemia lepidoneuralis Strand, 1918
Daisemia reticularis Linnaeus, 1761
Daulia afralis Walker, 1859
Diaphania indica Saunders, 1851
Diasemia acalis Walker, 1859
Diasemia taiwanalis Shibuya, 1928
Diasemiopsis ramburialis Duponchel, [1834]
Diathrausta brevifascialis Wileman, 1911
Diathrausta profundalis Lederer, 1863
Diplopseustis perieresalis Walker, 1859
Discothyris ferruginata Moore, 1888
Drosophantis corusca Meyrick, 1935
Dysallacta negatalis Walker, 1859
Elophila difflualis (Snellen, 1880)
Elophila nigralbalis Caradja, 1925
Elophila turbata Butler, 1881
Endocrossis caldusalis (Walker, 1859)
Eoophyla conjunctalis Wileman & South, 1917
Eoophyla gibbosalis Guenee, 1854
Eoophyla gibosalis (Guenée, 1854)
Eristena bifurcalis Pryer, 1877
Eschata miranda Belszynski, 1965
Euchromius lushanus Inoue, 1989
Euclasta dafamatalis Walker, 1859
Eudonia gigantea Sasaki, 1998
Eudonia inouei Sasaki, 1998
Eudonia owadai Sasaki, 1998
Eudonia promiscua Wileman & South, 1919
Eudonia taiwanalpina Sasaki, 1998
Eudonia umbrosa Sasaki, 1998
Eugauria albidentata Hampson, 1897
Eurrhyparodes accessalis Walker, 1859
Eurrhyparodes tricoloralis Zeller, 1852
Eusabena miltochristalis Hampson, 1896
Eusabena setinalis Hampson, 1918
Eutectona machoeralis Walker, 1859
Eutectona rubicundalis Warren, 1896
Gargela xanthocasis Meyrick, 1897
Glaucocharis tripunctata Moore, 1888
Glyphodes actorionalis Walker, 1859
Glyphodes bivitralis Guenee, 1854
Glyphodes canthusalis Walker, 1859
Glyphodes chalybifascia Hampson, 1896
Glyphodes chilka Moore, 1888
Glyphodes crithealis Walker, 1859
Glyphodes duplicalis Inoue, Munroe & Mutuura, 1981
Glyphodes eurytusalis Walker, 1859
Glyphodes formosanus Shibuya, 1928
Glyphodes itysalis Walker, 1859
Glyphodes perspectalis Walker, 1859
Glyphodes pyloalis Walker, 1859
Glyphodes stolalis Guenee, 1854
Goniorhynchus butyrosus Butler, 1879
Gynenomis sericealis Wileman & South, 1917
Haritalodes delicatalis Strand, 1918
Haritalodes derogatus Fabricius, 1775
Haritalodes lunalis Guenee, 1854
Haritalodes mundalis South, 1901
Haritalodes taiwanalis Shibuya, 1928
Hellula undalis Fabricius, 1794
Hendecasis duplifascialis Hampson, 1891
Hendecasis hampsona South, 1901
Hendecasis pulchella Hampson, 1916
Herpetogramma basale Walker, [1866]
Herpetogramma cynarale Walker, 1859
Herpetogramma dilatatipes Walker, [1866]
Herpetogramma elongale Warren, 1892
Herpetogramma fuscescens Warren, 1892
Herpetogramma hipponale Walker, 1859
Herpetogramma hoozana Strand, 1918
Herpetogramma licarsisale Walker, 1859
Herpetogramma luctuosale Bremer, 1864
Herpetogramma lulalis Strand, 1918
Herpetogramma magna Butler, 1879
Herpetogramma mimeticale Hering, 1901
Herpetogramma ochrimaculalis (South, 1901)
Herpetogramma rude Warren, 1892
Herpetogramma subalbescens Swinhoe, 1894
Hyalobathra brevialis Walker, 1859
Hyalobathra coenostolalis Snellen, 1890
Hyalobathra illectalis Walker, 1859
Hyalobathra undulinea Hampson, 1891
Hydriris chalybitis Meyrick, 1885
Hydriris ornatalis Duponchel, 1832
Hymenia perspectalis Hübner, 1796
Isocentris filalis Guenee, 1854
Lamprophaia albifimbrialis Walker, [1866]
Leechia sinuosalis South, 1901
Lepidoneura longipalpis Swinhoe, 1894
Lepyrodes geometralis Guenee, 1854
Leucinodella leucostola Hampson, 1896
Leucinodes apicalis Hampson, 1896
Leucinodes orbonalis Guenee, 1854
Loxostege formosibia Strand, 1918
Mabra eryxalis Walker, 1859
Mabra nigriscripta Swinhoe, 1859
Marasmia euryterminalis Hampson, 1917
Marasmia latimarginalis Hampson, 1891
Marasmia limbalis Wileman, 1911
Marasmia pilosa Warren, 1896
Marasmia poeyalis Boisduval, 1833
Marasmia suspicalis Walker, 1859
Maruca amboinalis Felder & Rogenhofer, 1874
Maruca vitrata Fabricius, 1787
Massepha absolutalis Walker, 1859
Mecyna tapa (Strand, 1918)
Mesolia bipunctella Wileman & South, 1918
Metasia coniotalis Hampson, 1903
Metasia masculina (Strand, 1918)
Metoeca foedalis Guenee, 1854
Metoeca nymphulalis (Strand, 1918)
Micraglossa manoi Sasaki, 1998
Microchilo kawabei Inoue, 1989
Microchilo nigellus Sasaki, 1993
Musotima colonalis Bremer, 1864
Nacoleia biformis Butler, 1889
Nacoleia charesalis Walker, 1859
Nacoleia chrysorycta Meyrick, 1884
Nacoleia commixta Butler, 1879
Nacoloeia amplificata Warren, 1896
Nausinoe perspectata (Fabricius, 1775)
Nevrina procopia Stoll, 1781
Nomis baibarensis Shibuya, 1928
Nomophila noctuella Denis & Schiffermüller, 1775
Noorda ignealis Hampson, 1899
Notarcha euryclealis Walker, 1859
Notarcha quaternalis Zeller, 1852
Notesia tranquillalis Lederer, 1863
Nymphicula blandialis (Walker, 1859)
Nymphicula hampsoni (South, 1901)
Nymphicula junctalis Hampson, 1891
Nymphicula mesorphna Meyrick, 1894
Nymphicula pantalis (Felder & Rogenhofer, 1874)
Omidoes noctescens Moore, 1888
Omiodes analis Snellen, 1880
Omiodes bianoralis Walker, 1859
Omiodes diemenalis Guenee, 1854
Omiodes indicatus Fabricius, 1775
Omiodes karenkonalis Shibuya, 1928
Omiodes perstygialis Hampson, 1912
Omiodes pyraustalis (Strand, 1918)
Omiodes sauteriale (Strand, 1918)
Omiodes similis Moore, 1885
Omiodes tristrialis Bremer, 1864
Omphisa anastomsalis Guenee, 1854
Orphanostigma abruptalis Walker, 1859
Orthospila definita Butler, 1889
Orthospila tigrina Moore, [1885]
Ostrinia scapulalis Walker, 1859
Ostrinia zealis Guenee, 1854
Ostrinina furnacalis Guenee, 1854
Pachybotys spissalis Guenee, 1854
Pachynoa sabelialis Guenee, 1854
Pachynoa thoosalis Walker, 1859
Pagada arbiter Butler, 1879
Pagyda auroralis Moore, 1888
Pagyda botydalis Snellen, 1882
Pagyda lustralis Snellen, 1890
Pagyda nebulosa Wileman & South, 1917
Pagyda quadrilineata Butler, 1881
Paliga anpingialis (Strand, 1918)
Paliga auratalis Warren, 1895
Paliga celatalis Walker, 1859
Paliga deductalis Walker, 1859
Paliga endotrichialis Hampson, 1918
Paliga schenklingi Strand, 1918
Palpita annulata Fabricius, 1794
Palpita annulifer Inoue, 1996
Palpita asiaticalis Inoue, 1994
Palpita candidata Inoue, 1996
Palpita homalia Inoue, 1996
Palpita hypohomalia Inoue, 1996
Palpita nigropunctalis Inoue, 1994
Palpita ochrocosta Inoue, 1996
Palpita pajnii Kirti & Rose, 1992
Palpita sejunctalis Inoue, 1997
Palpita warrenalis (Swinhoe, 1894)
Paracymoriza cataclystalis (Strand, 1919)
Paracymoriza distinctalis (Leech, 1899)
Paracymoriza laminalis Hampson, 1901
Paracymoriza prodigalis (Leech, 1899)
Paracymoriza taiwanalis Wileman & South, 1917
Paracymoriza vagalis Walker, [1866]
Paranacoleia lophophoralis Hampson, 1896
Parapoynx crisonalis Walker, 1859
Parapoynx diminutalis Snellen, 1880
Parapoynx fluctuosalis Zeller, 1852
Parapoynx stagnalis Zeller, 1852
Parapoynx villidalis Walker, 1859
Parapoynx vittalis (Bremer, 1864)
Paratalanta taiwanensis Yamanaka, 1972
Parbattia arisana Munroe & Mutuura, 1971
Parotis athysanota Hampson, 1912
Parotis laceritalis (Kenrick,1907)
Parotis margarita Hampson, 1893
Parotis suralis Lederer, 1863
Parthenodes prodigalis Leech, 1889
Patissa fulvosparsa Butler, 1881
Patissa nigropunctata Wileman & South, 1918
Patissa virginea Zeller, 1852
Pelena bimaculalis Shibuya, 1928
Pelena obscuralis Swinhoe, 1895
Pelena sericea Butler, 1879
Perinephela lancealis Munroe & Mutuura, 1968
Phalangiodes perspectatus Fabricius, 1775
Physematia defloralis Strand, 1919
Piletocera aegimiusalis Walker, 1859
Piletocera elongalis Warren, 1896
Placosaris taiwanalis Shibuya, 1928
Pleuroptya austa Strand, 1918
Pleuroptya balteata Fabricius, 1798
Pleuroptya chlorophanta Butler, 1878
Pleuroptya costalis Moore, 1888
Pleuroptya deficiens Moore, 1887
Pleuroptya haryoalis Strand, 1918
Pleuroptya inferior Hampson, 1898
Pleuroptya iopasalis Walker, 1859
Pleuroptya pernitescens Swinhoe, 1894
Pleuroptya punctimarginalis Hampson, 1896
Pleuroptya quadrimaculalis Kollar, 1844
Pleuroptya rubellalis Snellen, 1890
Pleuroptya ruralis Scopoli, 1763
Pleuroptya sabinusalis Walker, 1859
Pleuroptya scinisalis Walker, 1859
Pleuroptya sellalis Guenee, 1854
Pleuroptya ultimalis Walker, 1859
Polythlipta divaricata Moore, [1886]
Polythlipta maceratalis Lederer, 1863
Pramadea crotonalis Walker, 1859
Preneopogon catenalis Wileman, 1911
Prionapteron tenebrellum Hampson, 1895
Pronomis austa (Strand, 1918)
Pronomis flavicolor Munroe & Mutuura, 1968
Prophantis adusta Inoue, 1986
Prorodes mimicus Swinhoe, 1894
Protonoceras capitale Fabricius, 1794
Pseudargyria interruptella Walker, 1866
Pseudocatharylla duplicella Hampson, 1895
Pseudocatharylla infixella Walker, 1863
Pseudocatharylla simplex Zeller, 1877
Pycnarmon aeriferalis Moore, 1877
Pycnarmon cribrata Fabricius, 1794
Pycnarmon lactiferalis Walker, 1859
Pycnarmon marginalis Snellen, 1890
Pycnarmon meritalis Walker, 1859
Pycnarmon pantherata Butler, 1878
Pygospila tyres Cramer, [1780]
Pyrausta flavofimbriata Moore, 1888
Pyrausta incoloralis Guenee, 1854
Pyrausta mystica Heppner, 2005
Pyrausta obliquata Moore, 1888
Pyrausta panopealis Walker, 1859
Rehimena phrynealis Walker, 1859
Rehimena surusalis Walker, 1859
Rhectothyris gratiosalis Walker, 1859
Roxita bipunctella Wileman & South, 1917
Sameodes aptalis Walker, [1866]
Sameodes cancellalis Zeller, 1852
Scirpophaga excerptalis Walker, 1863
Scirpophaga fusciflua Hampson, 1893
Scirpophaga incertulas Walker, 1863
Scirpophaga nivella Fabricius, 1794
Scirpophaga praelata Scopoli, 1763
Scirpophaga virginia Schultze, 1908
Scirpophaga xanthogastrella Walker, 1863
Scirpophaga xanthopygata Schawerda, 1922
Scoparia subgracilis Sasaki, 1998
Scoparia taiwanensis Sasaki, 1998
Sinibotys evenoralis Walker, 1859
Sinibotys habisalis Walker, 1859
Sinibotys nectariphila Strand, 1918
Sisyrophora pfeifferae Lederer, 1863
Spoladea recurvalis Fabricius, 1775
Stenia charonialis (Walker, 1859)
Stenia minoralis Snellen, 1880
Strepsinoma hapilistalis Strand, 1919
Surattha albistigma Wileman & South, 1918
Syngamia falsidicalis Walker, 1859
Syngamia latimarginalis Walker, 1859
Syngamia vibiusalis Walker, 1859
Talanga nympha Butler, 1880
Tatobotys depalpalis Strand, 1919
Tatobotys janapalis Walker, 1859
Tenerobotys subfumalis Munroe & Mutuura, 1971
Terastia meticulosalis Guenee, 1854
Tetridia caletoralis Walker, 1859
Thliptoceras artatale Caradja, 1925
Thliptoceras cascale Swinhoe, 1890
Thliptoceras formosanum Munroe & Mutuura, 1968
Thliptoceras gladiale Leech, 1889
Thysanoidma octalis Hampson, 1891
Toxobotys nea (Strand, 1918)
Trichophysetis rufoterminalis Christoph, 1881
Tylostega photias Meyrick, 1894
Tylostega tylostegalis Hampson, 1900
Tyspanodes hypsalis Warren, 1891
Tyspanodes striatus Butler, 1879
Udea conubialis Yamanaka, 1972
Udea lolotialis Caradja, 1927
Udea poliostolalis Hampson, 1918
Udea stigmatalis Heppner, 2005
Udea testacea Butler, 1879
Udonomeiga vicinalis South, 1901
Uresiphita dissipatalis Lederer, 1863
Uresiphita gracilis Bulter, 1879
Uresiphita quinquigera Moore, 1888
Uresiphita tricolor Butler, 1879
Uthinia albisingnalis Hampson, 1896

Drepanidae
Agnidra scabiosa (Bryk, 1949)
Albara reversaria Warren, 1897
Amphitorna purpureofascia (Wileman, 1911)
Auaztellodes arianus (Wileman, 1911)
Auzata minuta Inoue, 1988
Auzata simpliciata Warren, 1897
Callicilix abraxata (Oberthür, 1893)
Callidrepana patrana (Moore, [1866])
Canucha miranda Matsumura, 1931
Cyclidia substigmaria (Hübner, 1831)
Demopsestis formosana Yoshimoto, 1983
Deroca hidda Inoue, 1988
Dipriodonta minima Inoue, 1988
Ditrigona conflexaria (Strand, [1917])
Ditrigona triangularia (Moore, 1868)
Drapetodes mitaria Guenée, 1857
Drepana pallida Okano, 1959
Epipsestis bilineata Yoshimoto, 1984
Epipsestis cortigera Yoshimoto, 1995
Epipsestis dubia László & Ronkay, 1999
Epipsestis manmiaoyangi László & Ronkay, 1999
Epipsestis meilingchani László & Ronkay, 1999
Epipsestis nikkoensis (Matsumura, 1921)
Habrosyne albipuncta (Wileman, 1910)
Habrosyne fraterna Werny, 1966
Habrosyne indica Werny, 1966
Habrosyne petrographa Werny, 1966
Horipsestis aenea (Wileman, 1911)
Horipsestis mushana (Matsumura, 1931)
Horithyatira takamukui (Matsumura, 1921)
Leucobrepsis fenestraria (Moore, 1868)
Leucobrepsis taiwanensis Buchsbaum & Miller, 2003
Macrauzata fenestraria Inoue, 1988
Macrauzata minor Okano, 1959
Macrocilix maia (Leech, 1888)
Macrocilix mysticata Inoue, 1988
Macrothyatira conspicua (Leech, 1900)
Macrothyatira flavida (Butler, 1885)
Macrothyatira flavimargo (Wileman, 1910)
Microblepsis manleyi Inoue, 1988
Microblepsis rugosa (Watson, 1968)
Microblepsis violacea (Bulter, 1889)
Microcilix abraxata (Oberthr, 1893)
Neotogaria saitonis Matsumura, 1931
Nordstromia semililacina Inoue, 1992
Nothoploca endoi Yoshimoto, 1983
Oreta brunnea Wileman, 1911
Oreta extensa Walker, 1855
Oreta fuscopurpurea Inoue, 1956
Oreta griseotincta Hampson, [1893]
Oreta insignis (Butler, 1877)
Oreta loochooana Swinhoe, 1902
Parpsestis argenteopicta (Wileman, 1911)
Parpsestis tomponis (Matsumura, 1933)
Phalacra kagiensis Wileman, 1916
Phalacra strigata Inoue, 1988
Psidopala kishidai Yoshimoto, 1987
Psidopala pennata (Wileman, 1914)
Psidopala shirakii (Matsumura, 1931)
Sewa taiwana (Wileman, 1911)
Strepsigonia diluta (Matsumura, 1927)
Takapsestis wilemaniella Matsumura, 1933
Tethea ampliata Okano, 1959
Tethea consimilis (Matsumura, 1931)
Tethea oberthueri (Matsumura, 1931)
Tethea octogesima (Matsumura, 1931)
Thyatira batis Matsumura, 1933
Tridrepana arikana (Matsumura, 1921)
Tridrepana flava (Moore, 1879)
Tridrepana unispina Watson, 1957
Wernya fufifasciata Yoshimoto, 1987
Zusidava serratilinea (Wileman, 1917)

Elachistidae
Aeolanthes brochias Meyrick, 1938
Aeolanthes erythrantis Meyrick, 1935
Agonopterix costaemaculella (Christoph, 1882)
Deuterogonia chionoxantha (Meyrick, 1931)
Deuterogonia pudorina (Wocke, 1857)
Elachista amamii Parenti, 1983
Elachista miscanthi Parenti, 1983
Ethmia assamensis (Butler, 1879)
Ethmia crocosoma Meyrick, 1914
Ethmia dentata Diakonoff & Sattler, 1966
Ethmia epitrocha (Meyrick, 1914)
Ethmia lapidella (Walsingham, 1880)
Ethmia lineatonotella (Moore, 1867)
Ethmia maculata Sattler, 1967
Ethmia maculifera (Matsumura, 1931)
Ethmia nigroapicella (Saalmueller, 1880)
Ethmia octanoma Meyrick, 1914
Ethmia okinawana (Matsumura, 1931)
Ethmia penesella Kun & Szaboky, 2000
Ethmia praeclara Meyrick, 1910
Ethmia pseudozygospila Kun & Szaboky, 2000
Ethmia susa Kun & Szaboky, 2000
Ethmia zygospila Meyrick, 1934
Synchalara rhombota (Meyrick, 1907)

Epermeniidae
Epermenia fuscomaculata Kuroko & Gaedike, 2006
Sinicaepermenia taiwanella Heppner, 1990

Epicopeiidae
Epicopeia hainesii Okano, 1973
Epicopeia mencia Moore, 1874

Epipyropidae
Epipomponia nawai (Dyar, 1904)

Eriocottidae
Compsoctena pinguis (Meyrick, 1914)
Eriocottis flavicephalana Issiki, 1930

Eupterotidae
Apha arisana Matsumura, 1927
Apha horishana Matsumura, 1927
Apona fuliginosa Kishida, 1993
Ganisa postica Matsumura, 1931
Palirisa cervina Matsumura, 1931

Galacticidae
Homadaula anisocentra Meyrick, 1922

Gelechiidae
Anacampsis anisogramma Meyrick, 1927
Anarsia aspera Park, 1995
Anarsia choana Park, 1995
Anarsia elongata Park, 1995
Anarsia euphorodes Meyrick, 1922
Anarsia isogona Meyrick, 1913
Anarsia patulella Walker, 1864
Anarsia protensa Park, 1995
Anarsia tricornis Meyrick, 1913
Aristotelia citrocosma Meyrick, 1908
Athrips polymaculella Park, 1991
Brachmia insuavis Meyrick, 1914
Capidentalis salicicola Park, 1995
Carpatolechia flavipunctatella Park, 1992
Clepsimacha eriocrossa Meyrick, 1934
Coconympha cyanorma Meyrick, 1934
Dendrophilia neotaphronoma Ponomarenko, 1993
Dendrophilia acris Park, 1995
Dendrophilia obscurella Park, 1993
Dendrophilia petrinopsis (Meyrick, 1935)
Dendrophilia saxigera Meyrick, 1931
Dichomeris aculata Park, 2001
Dichomeris acuminata Staudinger, 1876
Dichomeris albula Park & Hodges, 1995
Dichomeris angulata Park & Hodges, 1995
Dichomeris autometra Meyrick, 1934
Dichomeris bucinaria Park, 1996
Dichomeris crambalaeus Meyrick, 1913
Dichomeris cymatodes Meyrick, 1916
Dichomeris davisi Park & Hodges, 1995
Dichomeris elegans Park, 2001
Dichomeris ferruginosa Meyrick, 1913
Dichomeris fusca Park & Hodges, 1995
Dichomeris fuscalis Park & Hodges, 1995
Dichomeris heriguronis Matsumura
Dichomeris ioplaca Meyrick, 1934
Dichomeris linealis Park & Hodges, 1995
Dichomeris lividula Park & Hodges, 1995
Dichomeris loxospila (Meyrick, 1932)
Dichomeris lushanae Park & Hodges, 1995
Dichomeris malacodes Meyrick, 1910
Dichomeris microsphena Meyrick, 1921
Dichomeris oceanis Meyrick, 1920
Dichomeris ochreata Park & Hodges, 1995
Dichomeris ochthophora Meyrick, 1936
Dichomeris orientis Park & Hodges, 1995
Dichomeris oxycarpa Meyrick, 1935
Dichomeris pyrroschista Meyrick, 1934
Dichomeris rasilella Herrich-Schaeffer, 1855
Dichomeris summata Meyrick, 1913
Dichomeris symmetrica Park & Hodges, 1995
Dichomeris taiwana Park & Hodges, 1995
Dichomeris trilobella Park & Hodges, 1995
Evippe albidorsella Snellen, 1884
Faristenia obliqua Park, 2000
Helcystogramma arotraeum Meyrick, 1894
Helcystogramma hassenzanensis Park & Hodges, 1995
Helcystogramma hibisci Stainton, 1859
Helcystogramma triannulella Herrich-Schaeffer, 1854
Helcystogramma trijunctum Meyrick, 1934
Homochelas epichthonia Meyrick, 1935
Homochelas heppneri Park, 1995
Homochelas scriniata Meyrick, 1913
Hypatima arignota Meyrick, 1916
Hypatima disetosella Park, 1995
Hypatima excellentella Ponomarenko, 1991
Hypatima iophana Meyrick, 1913
Hypatima issikiana Park, 1995
Hypatima leptopalta Meyrick, 1934
Hypatima leptoptopal Meyrick, 1934
Hypatima ovata Park, 1999
Hypatima rhomboidella Linnaeus, 1758
Hypatima spathota Meyrick, 1913
Idiophantis chiridota Meyrick, 1914
Mesophleps sublutiana Park, 1990
Paralida triannulata Clarke, 1958
Parastenolechia asymmetrica Kanazawa, 1985
Parastenolechia claustrifera Meyrick, 1935
Pectinophora gossypiella Saunders, 1844
Phrixocrita aegidopis Meyrick, 1935
Polyhymno pancratiastis Meyrick, 1921
Polyhymno synodonta Meyrick, 1936
Scrobipalpa heliopa Lower, 1900
Sitotroga cerealella Olivier, 1789
Stegasta jejuensis Park & Omelko, 1994
Thiotricha acrophantis Meyrick, 1936
Thiotricha dissobola Meyrick, 1934
Thiotricha microrrhoda Meyrick, 1935
Thyrsostoma glaucitis Meyrick, 1907
Thyrsostoma pylartis Meyrick, 1908
Tituacia deviella Walker, 1864

Geometridae
Abaciscus alishanensis Inoue, 1978
Abaciscus changi Sato, 1997
Abaciscus costimacula (Wileman, 1912)
Abaciscus tristis Butler, 1889
Abraxas adilluminata Inoue, 1984
Abraxas antinebulosa Inoue, 1984
Abraxas consputa Bastelberger, 1909
Abraxas cupreilluminata Inoue, 1984
Abraxas fletcheri Inoue, 1984
Abraxas formosilluminata Inoue, 1984
Abraxas illuminata Warren, 1894
Abraxas parvimiranda Inoue, 1984
Abraxas persimplex Inoue, 1984
Abraxas placata Inoue, 1984
Abraxas stictotaenia Wehrli, 1932
Abraxas submartiaris Wehrli, 1932
Abraxas suspecta Warren, 1894
Abraxas taiwanensis Inoue, 1984
Abraxas tenellula Inoue, 1984
Abraxas tenuisuffusa Inoue, 1984
Abraxas wilemani Inoue, 1984
Acasis viretata Prout, 1958
Achrosis pulchra (Wileman, 1914)
Acolutha pictaria Warren, 1905
Acolutha pulchella Warren, 1905
Acrodontis aenigma (Prout, 1914)
Acrodontis mystica Kobayashi, 1998
Aethalura duplicata (Wileman, 1911)
Aethalura lushanalis Sato, 1987
Agaraeus discolor (Warren, 1893)
Agaraeus formosanus (Bastelberger, 1911)
Agaraeus luteus (Wileman, 1910)
Agathia diversiformis Warren, 1894
Agathia hemithearia Guenee, 1857
Agathia laetata (Fabricius, 1794)
Agathia lycaenaria (Kollar, 1844)
Agathia magnificentia Inoue, 1978
Agathia visenda Prout, 1917
Alcis admissaria Guenée, 1858
Alcis anmashanensis Sato, 1999
Alcis arizana Wileman, 1911
Alcis ectogramma (Wehrli, 1934)
Alcis hyberniata Bastelberger, 1909
Alcis maculata (Moore, 1867)
Alcis nubeculosa (Bastelberger, 1909)
Alcis pallens Inoue, 1978
Alcis plebeia Wileman, 1912
Alcis postlurida Inoue, 1978
Alcis rubicunda Bastelberger, 1909
Alcis scortea (Bastelberger, 1909)
Alcis semiusta (Bastelberger, 1909)
Alcis subpunctata Wileman, 1911
Alcis taiwanensis Inoue, 1978
Alcis taiwanovariegata (Wileman & South, 1917)
Alcis tayulina Sato, 1990
Amblychia angeronaria Guenee, 1857
Amblychia moltrechti (Bastelberger, 1909)
Amblychia sauteri (Prout, 1914)
Amoebotricha hiemalis Inoue, 1989
Amraica asahinai (Inoue, 1964)
Amraica superans (Sato, 1981)
Anectropis fumigata Sato, 1991
Anectropis semifascia (Bastelberger, 1909)
Anisephyra ocularia (Fabricius, 1775)
Anisodes effeminatus Prout, 1914
Anthyria grataria Wlk.
Anticlea canaliculata Warren, 1896
Antilycauges pinguis (Swinhoe, 1902)
Antipercnia cordiforma (Inoue, 1978)
Antitrygodes divisaria Prout, 1914
Apithecia viridata Prout, 1931
Aplochlora costipicta (Wileman, 1915)
Aplochlora grata (Butler, 1880)
Aplochlora viridis Warren, 1893
Aplochlora vivilaca Walker, 1861
Apochima praeacutaria (Inoue, 1976)
Aracima serrata Wileman, 1911
Archaeocasis micradelpha (Prout, 1958)
Ardonis filicata (Swinhoe, 1892)
Argyrocosma inductaria (Guenée, [1858])
Arichanna albomacularia Leech, 1891
Arichanna interplagata (Guenee, 1857)
Arichanna jaguararia Sato, 1999
Arichanna maculosa Wileman, 1912
Arichanna marginata Warren, 1893
Arichanna ochrivena Wileman, 1915
Arichanna olivescens Wileman&South, 1917
Arichanna picaria Wileman, 1910
Arichanna postflava Wileman, 1914
Arichanna pryeraria Leech, 1891
Arichanna sinica Inoue, 1978
Arichanna vernalis Fu & Sato, 2010
Ascotis selenaria (Walker, 1860)
Asthena melanosticta Wehrli, 1924
Asthena undulata (Wileman, 1915)
Atopophysa candidula Inoue, 1986
Atopophysa lividata (Bastelberger, 1909)
Atopophysa opulens Prout, 1914
Auaxa cesadaria Walker, 1860
Auaxa mimosina Inoue, 1992
Axinoptera anticostalis Galsworthy, 1999
Axinoptera taiwana Inoue, 2002
Berta rugosivalva Galsworthy, 1997
Berta zygophyxia Prout, 1912
Biston marginatus Shiraki, 1913
Biston melacron Wehrli, 1941
Biston perclarus (Warren, 1899)
Biston regalis (Warren, 1899)
Biston robustus Inoue, 1964
Bizia aexaria Walker, 1860
Blepharoctenucha virescens Inoue, 1986
Borbacha pardaria (Guenee, 1857)
Bosara atypha (Prout, 1958)
Bosara corrobusta Inoue, 2002
Bosara errabunda (Prout, 1958)
Bosara obliterata Inoue, 2002
Bosara porphyrea Inoue, 2002
Bosara subrobusta (Inoue, 1988)
Brabira artemidora Moore 1888
Brabira costimacula Wileman, 1915
Cabera niveopicta Inoue, 1986
Calicha griseoviridata (Wileman, 1911)
Calletaera basipuncta Wileman, 1916
Calletaera postvittata (Walker, 1861)
Calluga costalis Moore, 1887
Callygris compositata (Wileman, 1912)
Carige scutilimbata Prout, 1936
Catoria olivescens Moore, 1888
Catoria sublavaria (Guenee, 1857)
Celenna festivaria (Inoue, 1964)
Chaetolopha incurvata (Moore, 1888)
Chalyboclydon marginata Warren, 1893
Chartographa convexa (Wileman, 1912)
Chartographa fabiolaria Inoue, 1989
Chiasmia defixaria (Walker, 1861)
Chiasmia eleonora (Cramer, 1780)
Chiasmia elvirata (Guenee, 1857)
Chiasmia emersaria (Walker, 1861)
Chiasmia hebesata (Walker, 1861)
Chiasmia inchoata (Walker, 1861)
Chiasmia intermediaria (Leech, 1897)
Chiasmia kanshireiensis (Wileman, 1914)
Chiasmia monticolaria Wehrli, 1940
Chiasmia normata (Walker, 1861)
Chiasmia ozararia (Walker, 1860)
Chiasmia perfusaria (Walker, 1866)
Chiasmia pluviata (Fabricius, 1798)
Chlorissa arcana Yazaki, 1993
Chlorissa distinctaria (Walker, 1866)
Chloroclystis blanda (Bastelberger, 1911)
Chloroclystis dentatissima Warren, 1898
Chloroclystis rubroviridis (Warren, 1896)
Chloroclystis subrobusta (Inoue, 1988)
Chlorodontopera discospilata (Moore, 1867)
Chlorodontopera taiwana (Wileman, 1911)
Chorodna corticaria (Inoue, 1986)
Chorodna creataria (Guenée, [1858] )
Chorodna ochreimacula Prout, 1914
Chrioloba cinerea (Butler, 1880)
Chrioloba costimacula (Wileman & South, 1917)
Chrioloba etaina (Swinhoe, 1900)
Chrioloba inobtrusa (Wileman & South, 1917)
Chrysocrapeda faganaria (Guenée, [1858])
Chrysocraspeda sanguinea Warren, 1896
Cleora alienaria (Walker, 1860)
Cleora contiguata (Moore, 1868)
Cleora fraterna (Moore, 1888)
Cleora injectaria (Walker, 1860)
Cleora insolita (Butler, 1878)
Cleora leucophaea Sato, 2002
Cleora nigronotaria (Wileman, 1911)
Cleora repulsaria (Walker, 1860)
Collix ghosha Walker, 1862
Collix praetenta Prout, 1929
Collix stellata Warren 1894
Comibaena argentataria Leech, 1897
Comibaena cassidara (Guenée, [1858])
Comibaena delicatior (Warren, 1897)
Comibaena falcipennis (Yazaki, 1991)
Comibaena pictipennis Bulter, 1880
Comibaena procumbaria (Pryer, 1877)
Comibaena subdelicata Inoue, 1985
Comibaena takasago Okana, 1960
Comostola enodata Inoue, 1986
Comostola laesaria (Walker, 1861)
Comostola meritaria (Walker, 1861)
Comostola ocellulata Prout, 1920
Comostola pyrrhogona (Walker, 1866)
Comostola satoi Inoue, 1986
Comostola subtiliaria Prout, 1917
Corymica arnearia Walker, 1860
Corymica deducta (Walker, 1866)
Corymica pryeri Butler, 1878
Corymica spatiosa Prout, 1925
Corymica specularia (Moore, 1868)
Crypsicometa homoema Prout, 1926
Crypsicometa ochracea Inoue, 1971
Cryptochorina polychroia (Wehrli, 1941)
Culpinia diffusa (Walker, 1861)
Cusiala boarmioides (Moore, 1888)
Cyclophora effeminata (Prout, 1914)
Cyclophora intermixtaria (Swinhoe, 1892)
Cyclophora taiwana (Wileman, 1911)
Cystidia stratonice (Stoll, 1782)
Danala lilacina (Wileman, 1915)
Darisa lampasaria (Hampson, 1895)
Deileptenia rimosaria (Wileman, 1911)
Derambila dentifera (Moore, 1888)
Derambila fragilis (Butler, 1880)
Descoreba simplex Okana, 1960
Devenilia corearia (Prout, 1914)
Dilophodes elegans Swinhoe, 1892
Dindica kishidai Inoue, 1986
Dindica polyphaenaria (Guenée, [1858])
Dindica purpurata Bastelberger, 1911
Dindica taiwana Wileman, 1914
Dindica wilemani Prout, 1927
Diplurodes vestitus Inoue, 1976
Dischidesia cinerea (Bulter, 1880)
Discoglypha hampsoni (Swinhoe, 1892)
Discoglypha locupletata Prout, 1917
Dissoplaga flava (Wang, 1998)
Docirava flavilinata Wileman, 1915
Dooabia alia Yazaki, 1997
Doratoptera virescens Marumo, 1920
Duliophyle agitata Sato, 2002
Dysstroma calamistrata (Bastelberger, 1911)
Dysstroma cinereata (Moore, 1868)
Dysstroma dentifera (Warren 1896)
Dysstroma fumata (Bastelberger, 1911)
Dysstroma sikkimensis Heydemann, 1932
Echthrocollix minuta (Butler, 1881)
Ecliptopera benigna (Prout, 1914)
Ecliptopera delecta (Butler, 1880)
Ecliptopera fervidaria (Leech, 1897)
Ecliptopera muscicolor Prout, 1931
Ecliptopera recordans Prout, 1940
Ecliptopera rectilinea Prout, 1940
Ecliptopera triangulifera (Moore, 1888)
Ecliptopera umbrosaria Prout, 1940
Ectropis arizanensis Wileman, 1915
Ectropis bhurmitra (Walker, 1860)
Ectropis excellens (Butler, 1884)
Eilicrinia flava (Moore, 1888)
Electrophaes moltrechti Prout, 1940
Electrophaes taiwana Inoue, 1986
Electrophaes zaphenges Prout, 1940
Endropiodes indictinarius (Bremer, 1864)
Entomopteryx combusta (Warren, 1893)
Entomopteryx rubridisca (Wileman, 1911)
Eois grataria (Walker, 1861)
Eois lunulosa (Wileman, 1911)
Epilobophora nishizawai Yazaki, 1986
Epilobophora venipicta (Wileman, 1914)
Epirrita faenaria (Bastelberger, 1911)
Epobeidia lucifera (Wehrli, 1933)
Epobeidia tigrata (Inoue, 1986)
Eriopithex recensitaria Walker, 1862
Esakiopteryx venusta Yazaki, 1986
Eschatarchia lineata Inoue, 1970
Euchristophia cumulata Inoue, 1986
Eucosmabraxas octoscripta (Wileman, 1912)
Eucrostes disparata Walker, 1861
Eucyclodes albotermina (Inoue, 1978)
Eucyclodes biplagiata Rothschild
Eucyclodes divapala (Walker, 1861)
Eucyclodes gavissima (Walker, 1861)
Eucyclodes lalashana (Inoue, 1986)
Eucyclodes semialba (Walker, 1861)
Eulithis subalba (Prout, 1941)
Eumelea ludovicata Guenee, 1857
Eupithecia acutipapillata Inoue, 1988
Eupithecia albigutta Prout, 1958
Eupithecia alishana Inoue, 1970
Eupithecia assulata Bastelberger, 1911
Eupithecia astricta Inoue, 1988
Eupithecia blandula Mironov & Galsworthy, 2007
Eupithecia centaureata [Denis & Schiffermüller], 1775
Eupithecia chui Inoue, 1970
Eupithecia clavifera Inoue, 1955
Eupithecia concava Mironov & Galsworthy, 2007
Eupithecia convexa Inoue, 1988
Eupithecia costalis (Hampson, 1893)
Eupithecia costimacularia Leech, 1897
Eupithecia daemionata Dietze, 1903
Eupithecia dealbata Inoue, 1988
Eupithecia exrubicunda Inoue, 1988
Eupithecia flavimacula Mironov & Galsworthy, 2007
Eupithecia flavoapicaria Inoue, 1979
Eupithecia flexicornuta Inoue, 1988
Eupithecia funerea Inoue, 1988
Eupithecia hashimotoi Inoue, 1988
Eupithecia interpunctaria Inoue, 1979
Eupithecia jezonica Matsumura, 1927
Eupithecia karapinensis Wileman & South, 1917
Eupithecia kudoi Inoue, 1983
Eupithecia kuroshio Inoue, 1980
Eupithecia lini Mironov & Galsworthy, 2007
Eupithecia longipennata Inoue, 1988
Eupithecia lupa Mironov & Galsworthy, 2007
Eupithecia masculina Inoue, 1988
Eupithecia megaproterva Inoue, 1988
Eupithecia melanolopha Swinhoe, 1895
Eupithecia nishizawai Inoue, 1988
Eupithecia nuceistrigata Bastelberger, 1911
Eupithecia pellicata Mironov & Galsworthy, 2007
Eupithecia phantastica Mironov & Galsworthy, 2006
Eupithecia proterva Butler, 1878
Eupithecia quadripunctata Warren, 1888
Eupithecia rhadine Mironov & Galsworthy, 2007
Eupithecia rigida Swinhoe, 1892
Eupithecia stataria Inoue, 1988
Eupithecia tabidaria Inoue, 1955
Eupithecia taiwana Wileman & South, 1917
Eupithecia yazakii Inoue, 1988
Eupithecia yoshimotoi Inoue, 1988
Euryobeidia languidata (Walker, 1862)
Euryobeidia largeteaui (Oberthur, 1884)
Eustroma changi Inoue, 1986
Eustroma contorta (Warren, 1900)
Eustroma melancholica (Wileman, 1911)
Evecliptopera decurrens (Prout, 1940)
Fascellina chromataria Walker, 1860
Fascellina plagiata (Walker, 1866)
Fascellina subsignata Warren, 1893
Gagitodes omnifasciaria (Inoue, 1998)
Gandaritis sinicaria Wileman, 1920
Garaeus apicata Bastelberger, 1911
Garaeus argillacea (Butler, 1889)
Garaeus specularis Moore, 1868
Gasterocome pannosaria (Bastelberger, 1911)
Glaucoclystis griseorufa (Hampson, 1898)
Glaucoclystis satoi Inoue, 2002
Gnamptopteryx perficita (Hampson, 1902)
Gnophos ainuaria Bastelberger, 1909
Gnophos caenosa (Bastelberger, 1911)
Gnophos delitescens (Bastelberger, 1909)
Gonanticlea aversa Swinhoe, 1892
Gonanticlea ochreivittata (Bastelberger, 1909)
Gonanticlea subfalcata Wileman, 1914
Gonodontis pallida Butler, 1880
Gymnoscelis albicaudata Warren, 1897
Gymnoscelis deleta Hampson, 1891
Gymnoscelis expedita (Prout, 1958)
Gymnoscelis semialbida (Walker, 1866)
Gymnoscelis tristrigosa (Butler, 1880)
Harutaea flavizona Sato, 2000
Harutalcis fumigata (Bastelberger, 1909)
Hastina subfalcaria Moore, 1888
Hemistola kezukai Inoue, 1978
Hemistola monotona Inoue, 1983
Hemistola orbiculosa Inoue, 1978
Hemistola simplex Warren, 1899
Hemistola tenuilinea (Alphéraky, 1897)
Hemithea aquamarina Hampson, 1895
Hemithea insularia (Guenee, 1857)
Hemithea pallidimunda Inoue, 1986
Hemithea tritonaria (Walker, [1863])
Herochroma baibarana (Matsumura, 1931)
Herochroma cristata (Warren, 1894)
Herochroma ochreipicta (Swinhoe, 1905)
Herochroma supraviridaria Inoue, 1999
Heteralex aspersa (Matsumura, 1911)
Heterocallia deformis Inoue, 1986
Heterolocha arizana Wileman, 1910
Heterolocha biplagiata Bastelberger, 1909
Heterolocha coccinea Inoue, 1976
Heterolocha lilacina (Bastelberger, 1909)
Heterolocha marginata Wileman, 1910
Heterolocha patalata Felder & Rogenhofer, 1875
Heterolocha sabulosa (Bastelberger, 1909)
Heterolocha taiwana Wileman, 1910
Heterophleps confusa Prout, 1936
Heterophleps taiwana (Wileman, 1911)
Heterophleps variegata (Wileman, 1911)
Heterophleps violescens (Wileman, 1911)
Heterostegane hyriaria Warren, 1894
Heterostegane subtessellata (Walker, 1863)
Heterostegania lunulosa (Moore, 1888)
Heterothera incerta (Inoue, 1986)
Heterothera sororcula (Bastelberger, 1909)
Hirasa punctivenaria (Wileman, 1912)
Horisme macularia (Leech, 1897)
Hydatocapnia gemina Yazaki, 1990
Hydrelia arizana (Wileman, 1911)
Hydrelia bicauliata Prout, 1914
Hydrelia bicolorata (Moore 1868)
Hydrelia enisaria Prout, 1926
Hydrelia flammulata (Bastelberger, 1911)
Hydrelia rubrivena Wileman, 1911
Hydrelia ulula Bastelberger, 1911
Hyperythra lutea (Stoll, 1787)
Hypochrosis baenzigeri Inoue, 1982
Hypochrosis insularis (Bastelberger, 1909)
Hypochrosis rufescens (Bulter, 1880)
Hypocometa clauda Warren, 1896
Hypomecis brevifasciata (Wileman, 1911)
Hypomecis cineracea (Moore, 1888)
Hypomecis corticea (Bastelberger, 1911)
Hypomecis formosana (Wileman, 1912)
Hypomecis monotona (Inoue, 1978)
Hypomecis nudicosta Inoue, 1983
Hypomecis obliquisigna (Wileman, 1912)
Hypomecis percnioides (Wehrli, 1943)
Hypomecis punctinalis (Prout, 1914)
Hypomecis roboraria (Wileman, 1911)
Hyposidra aquilaria (Walker, 1862)
Hyposidra infixaria (Walker, 1860)
Hyposidra leucomela (Walker, 1866)
Hyposidra talaca (Walker, 1860)
Hysterura protagma Prout, 1940
Idaea costiguttata (Warren, 1896)
Idaea deleta (Wileman & South, 1917)
Idaea denudaria (Prout, 1913)
Idaea egenaria (Walker, 1861)
Idaea indigata (Wileman, 1915)
Idaea marcidaria (Walker, 1861)
Idaea methaemaria (Hampson, 1903)
Idaea muricolor (Warren, 1904)
Idaea paraula (Prout, 1914)
Idaea sakuraii (Inoue, 1963)
Idaea sinicata (Walker, 1861)
Idaea sugillata (Bastelberger, 1911)
Idaea taiwana (Wileman & South, 1917)
Idaea trisetata (Prout, 1922)
Idiochlora ussuriaria (Leech, 1897)
Idiotephria nakatomii Inoue, 1978
Iotaphora admirabilis (Oberthür, 1883)
Jankowskia taiwanensis Sato, 1980
Jodis argentilineata (Wileman, 1916)
Jodis inumbrata Warren, 1896
Jodis nanda (Walker, 1861)
Jodis rantaizanensis (Wileman, 1916)
Krananda latimarginaria Leech, 1891
Krananda lucidaria Leech, 1897
Krananda oliveomarginata Swinhoe, 1894
Krananda semihyalina Moore, 1867
Laciniodes umbrosus Inoue, 1983
Lampropteryx argentilineata (Leech, 1897)
Lampropteryx chalybearia (Moore, 1868)
Lampropteryx nishizawai Sato, 1990
Lampropteryx synthetica Prout, 1922
Lassaba brevipennis (Inoue, 1978)
Lassaba hsuhonglini Fu & Sato, 2010
Lassaba parvalbidaria (Inoue, 1978)
Lassaba tayulingensis (Sato, 1986)
Leptomiza calcearia (Walker, 1860)
Lipomelia subusta Warren, 1893
Lobogonia aculeata Wileman, 1911
Lobogonia formosana (Bastelberger, 1909)
Lobogonia sphagnata Bastelberger, 1911
Lobogonodes permarmorata (Bastelberger, 1909)
Lobogonodes taiwana (Wileman & South, 1917)
Lomographa anoxys (Wehrli, 1936)
Lomographa claripennis Inoue, 1977
Lomographa guttalata Yazaki, 1994
Lomographa inamata (Walker, 1861)
Lomographa lungtanensis (Wehrli, 1939)
Lomographa margarita (Moore, 1868)
Lomographa perapicata (Wehrli, 1924)
Lomographa percnosticta Yazaki, 1994
Lomographa platyleucata (Wileman, 1914)
Lomographa rara Yazaki, 1994
Lophobates inchoata (Prout, 1914)
Lophobates ochrolaria (Bastelberger, 1909)
Lophophelma iterans (Inoue, 1970)
Lophophelma taiwana Wileman, 1912
Lophophleps informis (Warren, 1897)
Lophophleps purpurea Hampson, 1891
Loxaspilates arrizanaria Bastelberger, 1909
Loxaspilates biformata Inoue, 1983
Loxaspilates densihastigera Inoue, 1983
Loxaspilates imitata (Bastelberger, 1909)
Loxaspilates montuosa Inoue, 1983
Loxaspilates nakajimai Inoue, 1983
Loxotephria olivacea Warren, 1905
Luxiaria amasa (Butler, 1878)
Luxiaria costinota Inoue, 1978
Luxiaria mitorrhaphes Prout, 1925
Luxiaria obliquata Moore, 1888
Macaria abydata Guenee, 1857
Macaria acutaria Walker, 1869
Martania albofasciata (Moore, 1888)
Martania denigrata Inoue, 2004
Martania obscurata (Bastelberger, 1909)
Martania seriata (Moore, 1888)
Martania sugii (Inoue, 1998)
Martania taiwana (Wileman, 1911)
Maxates acutigoniata (Inoue, 1989)
Maxates ambigua (Bulter, 1878)
Maxates extrambigua (Inoue, 1989)
Maxates glaucaria (Walker, 1866)
Maxates grandificaria (Graeser, 1890)
Maxates illiturata (Walker, [1863])
Maxates lactipuncta (Inoue, 1989)
Maxates microdonta (Inoue, 1989)
Maxates protrusa (Bulter, 1878)
Maxates quadripunctata (Inoue, 1989)
Maxates rufolimbata (Inoue, 1989)
Maxates semiprotrusa (Inoue, 1989)
Maxates sinuolata (Inoue, 1989)
Maxates thetydaria (Guenee, 1857)
Maxates versicauda (Prout, 1920)
Melanthia catenaria Prout, 1939
Melanthia procellata (Wehrli, 1931)
Menophra anaplagiata Sato, 1984
Menophra humeraria (Moore, 1868)
Menophra mitsundoi Sato, 1984
Menophra nakajimai Sato, 1984
Menophra taiwana (Wileman, 1910)
Mesastrape fulguraria (Walker, 1860)
Mesoleuca costipannaria (Moore, 1868)
Metabraxas rubrotincta Inoue, 1986
Metallolophia arenaria (Leech, 1889)
Meteima mediorufa (Bastelberger, 1911)
Microcalcarifera fecunda (Swinhoe, 1891)
Microcalicha fumosaria Sato, 1981
Microcalicha melanosticta (Hampson, 1895)
Microlygris complicata (Prout, 1940)
Micronidia intermedia Yazaki, 1992
Milionia zonea Druce, 1888
Mimochroa olivescens (Wileman, 1914)
Mixochlora vittata (Moore, 1867)
Mnesiloba dentifascia (Hampson, 1891)
Monocerotesa abraxides (Prout, 1914)
Monocerotesa coalescens (Bastelberger, 1909)
Monocerotesa conjuncta (Wileman, 1912)
Monocerotesa flavescens Inoue, 1998
Monocerotesa unifasciata Inoue, 1998
Monocerotesa virgata (Wileman, 1912)
Myrioblephara cilicornaria (Püngeler, 1904)
Myrioblephara fenchihuana Sato, 1987
Myrioblephara simplaria (Swinhoe, 1894)
Myrteta angelica Butler, 1881
Nadagara subnubila Inoue, 1967
Nadagara umbrifera Wileman, 1910
Nadagara vagaia Walker, 1862
Naxa textillis Walker, 1856
Naxidia punctata (Butler, 1880)
Neohipparchus hypoleuca (Hampson, 1903)
Neohipparchus vallatus (Bulter, 1878)
Ninodes splendens (Butler, 1878)
Ninodes watanabei Inoue, 1976
Nipponogelasma chlorissodes (Prout, 1912)
Nothomiza costalis (Moore, 1868)
Nothomiza flavicosta Prout, 1914
Obeidia tigrata Inoue, 1986
Obeidia vagipardata Inoue, 2003
Ocoelophora lentiginosaria (Bastelberger, 1911)
Odontopera albiguttulata Bastelberger, 1909
Odontopera bilinearia Inoue, 1986
Odontopera insulata Bastelberger, 1909
Oenospila flavifusata (Walker, 1861)
Operophtera variabilis Nakajima, 1991
Ophthalmitis albosignaria Sato, 1992
Ophthalmitis cordularia (Swinhoe, 1893)
Ophthalmitis herbidaria (Guenee, 1857)
Ophthalmitis sinensium (Oberthür, 1913)
Opisthograptis moelleri Warren, 1893
Opisthograptis punctilineata Wileman, 1910
Organopoda carnearia (Walker, 1861)
Orothalassodes pervulgatus Inoue, 2005
Orthobrachia simpliciata Yazaki, 2002
Orthocabera sericea Butler, 1879
Orthocabera tinagmaria (Guenee, 1857)
Orthonama obstipata (Fabricius, 1794)
Ourapteryx caecata (Bastelberger, 1911)
Ourapteryx changi Inoue, 1985
Ourapteryx clara Matsumura, 1910
Ourapteryx flavovirens Inoue, 1985
Ourapteryx inspersa Wileman, 1912
Ourapteryx monticola Inoue, 1985
Ourapteryx nigrociliaris Inoue, 1985
Ourapteryx pallidula Inoue, 1985
Ourapteryx ramosa (Wileman, 1910)
Ourapteryx sciticaudaria Walker, 1862
Ourapteryx similaria (Matsumura, 1910)
Ourapteryx taiwana Wileman, 1910
Ourapteryx variolaria Inoue, 1985
Ourapteryx venusta Inoue, 1985
Ourapteryx yerburii Matsumura, 1910
Oxymacaria normata (Wehrli, 1932)
Oxymacaria temeraria (Swinhoe, 1891)
Oxymacaria truncaria (Leech, 1897)
Ozola defectata Inoue, 1971
Pachyodes subtritus (Prout, 1914)
Palpoctenidia phoenicosoma Prout, 1939
Pamphlebia rubrolimbraria (Guenee, 1857)
Parabapta obliqua Yazaki, 1989
Parabapta unifasciata Inoue, 1986
Paracalicha psittacata (Bastelberger, 1909)
Paradarisa chloauges Prout, 1927
Paradarisa comparataria Wileman, 1911
Paramaxates hainana Chu, 1981
Paramaxates posterecta Holloway, 1976
Paramaxates taiwana Yazaki, 1988
Parapercnia giraffata (Guenee, 1857)
Pareclipsis serrulata (Wehrli, 1937)
Pareclipsis umbrata (Warren, 1894)
Parectropis nigrosparsa (Wileman&South, 1917)
Parectropis subflava (Bastelberger, 1909)
Pasiphila palpata (Walker, 1862)
Pelagodes antiquadrarius (Inoue, 1976)
Pelagodes proquadrarius (Inoue, 1976)
Pelagodes semengok Holloway, 1996
Pelagodes subquadraria (Inoue, 1976)
Pennithera fuliginosa Yazaki 2002
Pennithera lugubris Inoue, 1986
Pennithera manifesta Inoue, 1986
Pennithera subalpina Inoue, 1986
Pennithera subcomis (Inoue, 1978)
Peratophyga venetia Swinhoe, 1902
Peratostega deletaria (Moore, 1888)
Percnia longitermen Prout, 1914
Percnia luridaria Prout, 1914
Percnia suffusa Wileman, 1914
Perixera absconditaria (Walker, 1862)
Perixera contrariata (Walker, 1861)
Perixera decretaria (Walker, 1861)
Perixera griseata (Warren, 1896)
Perixera illepidaria (Guenée, [1858])
Perixera insitiva (Prout, 1920)
Perixera minorata Prout, 1938
Perixera obrinaria (Guenée, [1858])
Perixera sarawackaria (Guenee, 1857)
Perizoma costata (Wileman, 1911)
Perizoma fasciaria (Leech, 1897)
Petrophora chlorosata (Scopoli, 1763)
Phigalia owadai Nakajima, 1994
Phoenissa brephos Inoue, 1970
Photoscotosia atrostrigata (Bremer, 1864)
Photoscotosia insularis Bastelberger, 1909
Photoscotosia miniosata (Walker, 1862)
Phthonandria atrilineata (Wileman, 1911)
Phthonoloba fasciata (Moore 1888)
Phthonoloba viridifasciata (Inoue, 1963)
Physetobasis dentifascia Inoue, 1954
Piercia viridiplana (Bastelberger, 1911)
Piercia yui Inoue, 1970
Pingasa alba Swinhoe, 1891
Pingasa crenaria (Guenée, [1858])
Pingasa ruginaria Inoue, 1964
Pingasa secreta Inoue, 1986
Plagodis reticulata Warren, 1893
Platycerota vitticostata (Walker, [1863])
Plesiomorpha flaviceps (Butler, 1881)
Plesiomorpha punctilinearia (Leech, 1891)
Pogonopygia nigralbata Warren, 1894
Pogonopygia pavidus (Bastelberger, 1911)
Pomasia denticlathrata Warren, 1893
Postobeidia gravipardata Inoue
Postobeidia horishana (Matsumura, 1931)
Praobeidia gigantearia (Prout, 1914)
Problepsis albidior Prout, 1938
Problepsis conjunctiva Prout, 1917
Problepsis crassinotata Prout, 1917
Problepsis discophora Fixsen, 1887
Problepsis shirozui Inoue, 1986
Problepsis superans (Bulter, 1885)
Prochasma dentilinea (Warren, 1893)
Proteostrenia eumimeta Wehrli, 1936
Protoboarmia amabilis Inoue, 1983
Protonebula altera (Bastelberger, 1911)
Protonebula egregia Inoue, 1986
Pseudabraxas taiwana Inoue, 1986
Pseudeuchromia maculifera Schultze, 1907
Pseudocollix hyperythra Prout, 1941
Pseudomiza argentilinea Wang, 1998
Pseudomiza aurata Wileman, 1915
Pseudomiza flavitincta (Wileman, 1915)
Pseudomiza obliquaria (Leech, 1897)
Psilalcis albibasis (Hampson, 1895)
Psilalcis breta (Wileman, 1911)
Psilalcis diorthogonia (Wehrli, 1925)
Psilalcis fui Sato, 2002
Psilalcis menoides (Wehrli, 1943)
Psilalcis nigrifasciata (Wileman, 1912)
Psilalcis pulveraria (Wileman, 1912)
Psilalcis rotundata Inoue, 1998
Psyra conferta Inoue, 1983
Psyra cuneata Bastelberger, 1909
Psyra spurcataria (Walker, [1863])
Pylargosceles steganioides (Wileman, 1915)
Racotis boarmiaria (Guenee, 1857)
Ramobia anmashana Sato, 2002
Rheumaptera albofasciata Inoue, 1986
Rheumaptera marmoraria (Leech, 1897)
Rheumaptera nengkaoensis Inoue, 1986
Rhodostrophia bisinuata Prout, 1938
Rikiosatoa fucataria (Wileman, 1911)
Rikiosatoa mavi (Prout, 1915)
Rikiosatoa transversa Inoue, 1998
Ruttelerona pseudocessaria Holloway, 1993
Ruttellerona pseudocessaria Holloway, 1993
Sarcinodes carnearius Geuenee, 1857
Sarcinodes mongaku Marumo, 1920
Sarcinodes yayeyamanus Inoue, 1976
Sarcinodes yeni Sommerer, 1996
Satoblephara owadai (Inoue, 1978)
Sauris angulosa (Warren 1896)
Sauris angustifasciata (Inoue, 1976)
Sauris inscissa (Prout, 1958)
Sauris interruptata (Moore, 1888)
Sauris marginepunctata (Warren, 1899)
Scardamia metallaria Guenee, 1857
Schistophyle falcifera Warren, 1896
Scionomia praeditaria (Leech, 1897)
Scionomia sinuosa (Wileman, 1910)
Scopula actuaria (Walker, 1861)
Scopula adeptaria (Walker, 1861)
Scopula albilarvata (Warren, 1899)
Scopula anatreces Prout, 1920
Scopula attentata (Walker, 1861)
Scopula caesaria (Walker, 1861)
Scopula defectiscripta Prout, 1914
Scopula emissaria (Walker, 1861)
Scopula emma (West, 1930)
Scopula formosana Prout, 1934
Scopula ignobilis (Warren, 1901)
Scopula impersonata (Walker, 1861)
Scopula isomerica Prout, 1922
Scopula kagiata (Bastelberger, 1909)
Scopula limbata (Wileman, 1915)
Scopula mecysma (Swinhoe, 1894)
Scopula nesciaria (Walker, 1861)
Scopula nigropunctata (Walker, 1862)
Scopula personata (Prout, 1913)
Scopula propinquaria (Leech, 1897)
Scopula proximaria (Wileman, 1911)
Scopula pulchellata Prout, 1938
Scopula punctatissima (Bastelberger, 1911)
Scopula rantaizanensis (Wileman, 1915)
Scopula sauteri Prout, 1922
Scopula sybillaria (Swinhoe, 1902)
Scopula yamanei Inoue, 1978
Seleniopsis evanescens (Bulter, 1881)
Sibatania arizana (Wileman, 1911)
Somatina plynusaria (Walker, 1862)
Somatina rosacea Prout, 1914
Spaniocentra hollowayi Inoue, 1985
Spiralisigna subpumilata (Inoue, 1972)
Syncosmia bicornuta Inoue, 2002
Syncosmia patinata Warren, 1897
Synegia esther Butler, 1881
Synegia estherodes Sato, 1990
Synegia eumeleata Walker, 1861
Synegia limitata (Warren, 1897)
Synegia masuii Sato, 1990
Synegia pallens Sato, 1990
Synegiodes histrionarius (Bastelberger, 1909)
Tanaoctenia haliaria (Walker, 1861)
Tanaorhinus formosanus Okana, 1959
Tanaorhinus kina Inoue, 1978
Tanaorhinus viridiluteatus (Walker, 1861)
Tasta argozana Prout, 1926
Telenomeuta punctimarginaria (Leech, 1891)
Thalassodes intaminata Inoue, 1971
Thalassodes opalina Bulter, 1880
Thinopteryx crocoptera Swinhoe, 1916
Thinopteryx nebulosa Bulter, 1883
Timandra comptaria Walker, 1862
Timandra convectaria Walker, 1861
Timandra dichela (Prout, 1935)
Timandra extremaria Walker, 1861
Timandra synthaca (Prout, 1938)
Timandromorpha discolor (Warren, 1896)
Timandromorpha enervata Inoue, 1944
Traminda aventiaria (Guenée, [1858])
Trichoplites albimaculosa Inoue, 1978
Trichoplites ingressa Prout, 1939
Trichopterigia adorabilis Yazaki, 1987
Trichopterigia kishidai Yazaki 1987
Trichopterigia nivocellata (Bastelberger, 1911)
Trichopterigia rubripuncta Wileman 1916
Trichopterigia rufinotata (Butler, 1889)
Trichopterigia sanguinipunctata (Warren 1893)
Trichopterigia yoshimotoi Yazaki 1987
Trichopteryx fastuosa Inoue, 1958
Trichopteryx fui Yazaki, 2002
Trichopteryx fusconotata Hashimoto, 1983
Trichopteryx terranea (Bulter, 1878)
Triphosa atrifascia Inoue, 2004
Triphosa lugens Bastelberger, 1909
Triphosa praesumtiosa Prout, 1941
Triphosa rantaizanensis Wileman, 1916
Triphosa rotundata Inoue, 2004
Triphosa rubrifusa Bastelberger, 1909
Triphosa umbraria (Leech, 1891)
Tristeirometa decussata (Prout, 1958)
Tristrophis rectifascia (Wileman, 1912)
Trotocraspeda divaricata (Moore, 1888)
Tyloptera bella (Inoue, 1966)
Uliura infausta (Prout, 1958)
Venusia lineata Wileman, 1916
Vindusara moorei (Thierry-Mieg, 1899)
Wilemania nitobei (Nitobe, 1907)
Xandrames dholaria Moore, 1868
Xandrames latiferaria Warren, 1894
Xanthorhoe curcumata (Moore, 1888)
Xanthorhoe cybele Prout, 1931
Xanthorhoe mediofascia (Wileman, 1915)
Xanthorhoe saturata (Guenee, 1857)
Xanthorhoe taiwana (Wileman, 1914)
Xenoplia trivialis (Yazaki, 1987)
Xenortholitha corioidea (Bastelberger, 1911)
Xenortholitha latifusata (Walker, 1862)
Xerodes albonotaria (Inoue, 1971)
Xerodes contiguaria (Leech, 1897)
Xerodes crenulata (Wileman, 1915)
Xerodes obscura (Warren, 1899)
Xyloscia dentifera Inoue, 1986
Yashmakia suffusa (Warren, 1893)
Zanclopera calidata Warren, 1905
Ziridava kanshireiensis Prout, 1958
Zygophyxia relictata (Walker, 1866)
Zythos avellanea (Prout, 1923)

Glyphipterigidae
Carmentina molybdotoma (Diakonoff & Arita, 1979)
Carmentina perculta (Diakonoff, 1979)
Carmentina taiwanensis Arita & Heppner, 1992
Glyphipterix affinis Arita & Heppner, 1992
Glyphipterix ametris Diakonoff, 1979
Glyphipterix concoluta Arita & Heppner, 1992
Glyphipterix ditiorana (Walker, 1863)
Glyphipterix formosametron Arita & Heppner, 1992
Glyphipterix formosensis Arita & Heppner, 1992
Glyphipterix gemmula Diakonoff & Arita, 1976
Glyphipterix grandis Arita & Heppner, 1992
Glyphipterix issikii Arita & Heppner, 1992
Glyphipterix lineovalvae Arita & Heppner, 1992
Glyphipterix lunaris Arita & Heppner, 1992
Glyphipterix maculata Arita & Heppner, 1992
Glyphipterix marinae Arita & Heppner, 1992
Glyphipterix miniata Arita & Heppner, 1992
Glyphipterix nizonata Arita & Heppner, 1992
Glyphipterix protoscleriae Arita & Heppner, 1992
Glyphipterix pseudogamma Arita & Heppner, 1992
Glyphipterix pseudomelania Arita & Heppner, 1992
Glyphipterix pseudotaiwana Arita & Heppner, 1992
Glyphipterix rekoae Arita & Heppner, 1992
Glyphipterix taiwana Arita & Heppner, 1992
Glyphipterix tenuis Arita & Heppner, 1992
Glyphipterix tona Arita & Heppner, 1992
Glyphipterix trigonodes Arita, 1979
Glyphipterix virgata Arita & Heppner, 1992
Lepidotarphius perornatella (Walker, 1864)

Gracillariidae
Acrocercops clisopa Meyrick, 1935
Acrocercops irradians Meyrick, 1931
Acrocercops isonoma Meyrick, 1916
Acrocercops melanoplecta Meyrick, 1908
Acrocercops transecta Meyrick, 1931
Acrocercops unistriata Yuan, 1986
Caloptilia chrysolampra (Meyrick, 1936)
Caloptilia theivora (Walsingham, 1891)
Caloptilia zachrysa (Meyrick, 1907)
Calybites isograpta (Meyrick, 1928)
Conopomorpha litchiella Bradley, 1986
Conopomorpha sinensis Bradley, 1986
Cuphodes scioplintha (Meyrick, 1934)
Deoptilia heptadeta (Meyrick, 1936)
Diphtheroptila scriptulata (Meyrick, 1916)
Epicephala chalybacma Meyrick, 1908
Epicephala venenata Meyrick, 1935
Eteoryctis deversa (Meyrick, 1922)
Gibbovalva quadrifasciata (Stainton, 1863)
Melanocercops phractopa (Meyrick, 1918)
Phodoryctis caerulea (Meyrick, 1912)
Phodoryctis stephaniae Kumata & Kuroko, 1988
Phyllocnistis citrella Stainton, 1856
Phyllocnistis saligna (Zeller, 1839)
Phyllocnistis selenopa Meyrick, 1915
Phyllonorycter orientalis (Kumata, 1963)
Phyllonorycter pulchra (Kumata, 1963)
Phyllonorycter triarcha (Meyrick, 1908)
Phyllonorycter triplacomis (Meyrick, 1936)
Porphyrosela dorinda (Meyrick, 1912)
Spulerina dissotoma (Meyrick, 1931)
Systoloneura geometropis (Meyrick, 1936)
Telamoptilia cathedraea (Meyrick, 1908)
Telamoptilia hemistacta (Meyrick, 1918)
Telamoptilia prosacta (Meyrick, 1918)

Heliodinidae
Epicroesa metallifera Meyrick, 1907

Hepialidae
Endoclita davidi (Poujade, 1886)
Endoclita excrescens (Butler, 1877)
Endoclita inouei Ueda, 1987
Endoclita sinensis (Moore, 1877)
Hepialiscus monticola Ueda, 1988
Hepialiscus robinsoni Ueda, 1988
Hepialiscus taiwanus Ueda, 1988
Palpifer hopponis Matsumura, 1931
Palpifer sexnotatus (Moore, 1879)
Parathitarodes changi Ueda, 1999
Thitarodes arizana (Matsumura, 1931)

Hyblaeidae
Hyblaea constellata Guenee, 1852
Hyblaea firmamentum Guenee, 1852
Hyblaea puera (Cramer, 1777)

Immidae
Alampla arcifraga (Meyrick, 1914)
Alampla oalaeodes (Meyrick, 1914)
Birthana taiwana Heppner, 1990
Imma asaphoneura Meyrick, 1934
Imma flavibasa Moore, 1887
Imma lathidora Meyrick, 1914
Imma mylias Meyrick, 1906
Imma tricrocota Meyrick, 1935
Moca auxobathra (Meyrick, 1906)
Moca fungosa (Meyrick, 1914)

Lasiocampidae
Arguda horishana (Matsumura, 1927)
Bharetta owadai Kishida, 1986
Cosmotriche discitincta Wileman, 1914
Dendrolimus arizanus (Wileman, 1910)
Dendrolimus kikuchii Matsumura, 1927
Dendrolimus punctatus (Walker, 1855)
Dendrolimus taiwanus (Matsumura, 1932)
Euthrix laeta (Walker, 1855)
Euthrix nigropuncta (Wileman, 1910)
Euthrix ochreipuncta (Wileman, 1910)
Euthrix tamahonis (Matsumura, 1927)
Gastropacha horishana Matsumura, 1927
Gastropacha insularis Zolotuhin, 2005
Gastropacha pardalis Tams, 1935
Gastropacha xenapates Tams, 1935
Kunugia brunnea (Wileman, 1915)
Kunugia undans (Strand, 1915)
Lebeda nobilis Walker, 1855
Malacosoma neustria Matsumura, 1932
Metanastria hyrtaca (Cramer, 1779)
Odonestis formosae Wileman, 1910
Odonestis pruni (Linnaeus, 1758)
Pachypasoides albisparsus (Wileman, 1910)
Paradoxopla sinuata (Wileman, 1915)
Paralebeda plagifera (Walker, 1855)
Pyrosis ni (Wang & Fan, 1995)
Pyrosis wangi Zolotuhin & Witt, 2007
Radhica flavovittata (Matsumura, 1932)
Somadasys catocoides (Strand, 1915)
Syrastrena sumatrana Kishida, 1985
Syrastrenopsis kawabei Kishida, 1991
Takanea excisa (Wileman, 1910)
Trabala vishnou (Matsumura, 1909)

Lecithoceridae
Athymoris aurantiella Park, 2000b
Athymoris liukueiensis Park, 2000b
Athymoris martialis Meyrick, 1935
Athymoris phreatosa Wu, 1994
Athymoris subtrigona Park, 2000b
Carodista cultrata Park, 2000
Carodista fushanensis Park, 2000
Carodista montana Park, 2000
Carodista notolychna Meyrick, 1936
Caveana senuri Park, 2013
Deltoplastis commatopa Meyrick, 1932
Deltoplastis lobigera Gozmany, 1978
Deltoplastis ovatella Park, 2001
Dinochares notolepis Park, 2000
Epimactis talantias Meyrick, 1908
Frisilia chinensis Gozmany, 1978
Frisilia cornualis Park, 2008
Frisilia homalistis Meyrick, 1935
Halolaguna oncopterux Wu, 1994
Halolaguna palinensis Park, 2000b
Halolaguna sublaxata Gozmany, 1978
Homaloxestis baibaraensis Park, 1999
Homaloxestis cholopis Meyrick, 1906
Homaloxestis hilaris Gozmany, 1978
Homaloxestis myeloxesta Meyrick, 1932
Issikiopteryx japonica Moriuti, 1973
Issikiopteryx taipingensis Park, 2003
Issikiopteryx zonophaera (Meyrick, 1935)
Lecithocera altusana Park, 1999
Lecithocera anguistiella Park, 1999
Lecithocera atricastana Park, 1999
Lecithocera aulias Meyrick, 1910
Lecithocera bimaculata Park, 1999
Lecithocera chartaca Wu & Liu, 1993
Lecithocera dondavisi Park, 2013
Lecithocera erecta Park, 1935
Lecithocera fascicula Park, 1999
Lecithocera fascinatrix Meyrick, 1935
Lecithocera fuscosa Park, 1999
Lecithocera glabrata Wu & Liu, 1992
Lecithocera indigens Meyrick, 1914
Lecithocera latiola Park, 1999
Lecithocera megalopis Meyrick, 1916
Lecithocera metacausta Meyrick, 1910
Lecithocera palingensis Park, 1999
Lecithocera paralevirota Park, 1999
Lecithocera pelomorpha Meyrick, 1931
Lecithocera pulchella Park, 1999
Lecithocera rotundata Gozmany, 1978
Lecithocera serena Gozmany, 1978
Lecithocera shanpinensis Park, 1999
Lecithocera thaiheisana Park, 1999
Lecithocera theconoma Meyrick, 1926
Lecithocera tienchiensis Park, 1999
Lecitholaxa thiodora Meyrick, 1914
Lysipatha diaxantha Meyrick, 1932
Lysipatha zonosphaera Meyrick, 1932
Nosphistica bisinuata Park, 2002
Nosphistica fenestrata Gozmany, 1978
Nosphistica fuscolepis Park, 2002
Nosphistica paramecola Wu, 1996
Nosphistica tarokoensis Park, 2002
Philharmonia adusta Park, 2000b
Spatulignatha idiogena Wu, 1994
Spatulignatha olaxana Wu, 1994
Synesarga bleszynskii Gozmany, 1978
Synesarga caradjai Gozmany, 1978
Thubana albisignis (Meyrick, 1914)
Thubana deltaspis Meyrick, 1935
Thubana spinula Park, 2001
Tisis mesozosta Meyrick, 1914
Torodora albicruris Park & Heppner, 2000
Torodora capillaris Park & Heppner, 2000
Torodora chinanensis Park, 2003
Torodora galera Wu & Liu, 1994
Torodora manoconta Wu & Liu, 1994
Torodora octovara Meyrick, 1932
Torodora ortilege (Meyrick, 1911)
Torodora parthenopis Meyrick, 1932
Torodora pseudogalera Park, 2004
Torodora rectilinea Park, 2003
Torodora sciadosa Wu & Liu, 1994

Limacodidae
Altha lacteola Strand, 1915
Althonarosa horisyaensis Kawada, 1930
Belippa horrida Walker, 1865
Cania heppneri Inoue, 1992
Ceratonema wilemani West, 1932
Chalcoscelides castaneipars (Moore, 1866)
Chibiraga banghaasi (Hering & Hopp, 1927)
Dactylorhychides rufibasale (Hampson, 1896)
Darna furva (Wileman, 1911)
Darna pallivitta (Moore, 1877)
Darna trima (Moore, 1860)
Demonarosa rufotessellata (Moore, 1879)
Demonarosa rufotessellata subrosea (Wileman, 1915)
Flavinarosa obscura (Wileman, 1911)
Iraga rugosa (Wileman, 1911)
Mahanta kawadai Yoshimoto, 1995
Mahanta zolotuhini Solovyev, 2005
Microleon lingipalpis Bulter, 1885
Miresa fulgida Wileman, 1910
Monema rubriceps (Matsumura, 1931)
Nagodopsis shirakiana Matsumura, 1931
Narosa corusca Wileman, 1911
Narosa fulgens (Leech, 1889)
Narosa nigrisigna Wileman, 1911
Narosa nitobei Shiraki, 1913
Narosoideus vulpinus (Wileman, 1911)
Natada arizana (Wileman, 1916)
Neiraga baibarana Matsumura, 1931
Parasa bicolor (Matsumura, 1911)
Parasa darma Moore, 1860
Parasa hilarata (Staudinger, 1887)
Parasa martini Solovyev, 2010
Parasa pastoralis Bulter, 1880
Parasa pygmy Solovyev, 2010
Parasa shirakii Kawada, 1930
Parasa tessellata Moore, 1877
Parasa viridiflamma Wu & Chang, 2013
Phlossa conjuncta (Walker, 1855)
Phlossa melli (Hering, 1931)
Phlossa taiwana (Wileman, 1916)
Phrixolepia inouei Yoshimoto, 1993
Rhamnopsis arizanella Matsumura, 1931
Rhamnosa uniformis (Swinhoe, 1895)
Scopelodes contractus Walker, 1855
Setora baibarana (Matsumura, 1931)
Setora sinensis Moore, 1877
Sinensis formosana Wileman, 1911
Spatulifimbria castaneiceps Hering, 1931
Susica sinensis Wileman
Thosea bicolor Shiraki, 1913
Thosea cana (Walker, 1865)
Thosea castanea Wileman, 1911
Thosea conspersa (Bulter, 1880)
Thosea postornata Hampson, 1900
Thosea rufa Wileman, 1915
Thosea sinensis (Walker, 1855)
Trichogyia circulifera Hering, 1933

Lymantriidae
Arctornis cygna (Moore, 1879)
Arctornis flavicostata (Matsumura, 1927)
Arctornis formosensis (Strand, 1922)
Arctornis jonasii (Butler, 1877)
Arctornis kanazawai Inoue
Arctornis l-nigrum Okano
Arna bipunctapex (Hampson), 1891
Aroa substrigosa Walker
Calliteara angulata (Hampson, 1891)
Calliteara arizana (Wileman, 1911)
Calliteara baibarana (Matsumura, 1927)
Calliteara contexta Kishida, 1998
Calliteara grotei (Matsumura, 1927)
Calliteara kikuchii (Matsumura, 1927)
Calliteara lunulata (Matsumura, 1927)
Calliteara multilineata (Swinhoe, 1917)
Calliteara postfusca (Swinhoe, 1895)
Calliteara saitonis (Matsumura, 1927)
Calliteara taiwana (Wileman, 1910)
Cifuna locuples Walker
Dasychira suisharyonis Strand
Dura alba Moore
Euproctis alikangiae Strand, 1914
Euproctis angulata Matsumura, 1927
Euproctis aurata Wileman, 1911
Euproctis baibarana Matsumura, 1927
Euproctis bimaculata Matsumura, 1921
Euproctis brachycera Collentte, 1938
Euproctis centrofascia Matsumura, 1921
Euproctis chibiana Matsumura, 1927
Euproctis croceola Strand, 1918
Euproctis dissimilis Wileman, 1910
Euproctis endoplagia Hampson, 1897
Euproctis hopponis (Matsumura, 1933)
Euproctis inornata Wileman, 1910
Euproctis insulata Wileman, 1910
Euproctis kanshireia Wileman, 1910
Euproctis karapina Strand, 1914
Euproctis latifascia Strand, 1914
Euproctis lubecula Wileman, 1910
Euproctis macropleura (Strand, 1914)
Euproctis magna Swinhoe, 1891
Euproctis nigricauda Matsumura, 1931
Euproctis nigropuncta Wileman, 1910
Euproctis postalbata Matsumura, 1933
Euproctis postfusca Wileman & South, 1917
Euproctis pterofera Strand, 1914
Euproctis pulverea (Leech, 1888)
Euproctis purpureofasciata Wileman, 1914
Euproctis sericea Wileman, 1910
Euproctis shironis Matsumura, 1933
Euproctis simplex Wileman, 1911
Euproctis sparsa Wileman, 1910
Euproctis staudingeri (Leech, 1889)
Euproctis striata Wileman, 1910
Euproctis taiwana (Shiraki, 1913)
Euproctis tamahonis Matsumura, 1927
Euproctis tomponis (Matsumura, 1929)
Euproctis uchidai Matsumura, 1927
Euproctis unifascia Wileman
Euproctis unipunctapex Shiraki, 1913
Euproctis urocoma (Strand, 1914)
Euproctis usukia Matsumura, 1933
Euproctis varians (Walker, 1855)
Euproctis virguncula Walker, 1855
Eurpoctis mimosa (Matsumura, 1933)
Eurpoctis shirakii Matsumura
Ilema kosemponica (Strand), 1914
Ilema nachiensis (Marumo, 1917)
Ilema nigrofascia (Wileman), 1911
Ilema olivacea (Wileman), 1910
Laelia exclamationis (Kollar, 1844)
Laelia formosana Strand
Laelia striata Wileman
Leucoma clara (Walker, 1865)
Leucoma niveata (Walker, 1865)
Locharna strigipennis Moore
Lymantria concolor Walker, 1855
Lymantria grisea Strand, 1914
Lymantria iris Strand, 1911
Lymantria mathura Butler, 1877
Lymantria sinica Moore, 1879
Lymantria sugii Kishida, 1986
Lymantria umbrifera Wileman, 1910
Lymantria xylina Swinhoe, 1903
Medama diplaga (Hampson, 1910)
Numenes patrana Moore
Numenes takamukui Matsumura
Olene dudgeoni (Swinhoe), 1907
Olene inclusa (Walker), 1856
Olene mendosa (Hübner), 1823
Orgyia nantonis Matsumura
Orgyia postica (Walker, 1855)
Pantana ochripalpis (Strand, 1914)
Pantana pluto (Leech, 1890)
Pantana seriatopunctata Matsumura
Pantana visum Walker
Perina nuda (Fabricius, 1787)
Pida decolorata Matsumura
Pida postalba Wileman
Psalis ennatula (Fabricius, 1793)
Somena scintillans (Walker, 1856)

Lyonetiidae
Lyonetia anthemopa Meyrick, 1936
Lyonetia clerkella (Linnaeus, 1758)

Macropiratidae
Agdistopis sinhala (T. B. Fletcher, 1909)

Micropterigidae
Palaeomicroides anmashanensis Hashimoto
Palaeomicroides aritai Hashimoto
Palaeomicroides caeruleimaculella Issiki
Palaeomicroides costipunctella Issiki
Palaeomicroides discopurpurella Issiki
Palaeomicroides fasciatella Issiki
Palaeomicroides marginella Issiki
Palaeomicroides obscurella Issiki
Paramartyria bimaculella Issiki
Paramartyria maculatella Issiki
Paramartyria ovalella Issiki

Momphidae
Mompha lychnopis Meyrick, 1933

Neopseustidae
Neopseustis meyricki Hering, 1925

Noctuidae
Abrostola abrostolina (Butler, 1879)
Abrostola anophioides Moore, 1882
Abrostola suisharyonis Strand, 1920
Acantholipes larentioides Strand, 1920
Acantholipes trajectus (Walker, 1865)
Achaea janata (Linnaeus, 1758)
Achaea serva (Fabricius, 1775)
Acidon nigrobasis (Swinhoe, 1905)
Acontia bicolora Leech, 1889
Acontia crocata Guenee, 1852
Acontia marmoralis (Fabricius, 1794)
Acontia olivacea (Hampson, 1891)
Acronicta albistigma Hampson, 1909
Acronicta denticulata B.S.Chang, 1991
Acronicta digna (Butler, 1881)
Acronicta gigasa Chang, 1991
Acronicta hercules (Felder & Rogenhofer, 1874)
Acronicta intermedia (Warren, 1909)
Acronicta pruinosa (Guenee, 1852)
Actinotia intermediata (Bremer, 1861)
Acygnatha terminalis (Wileman, 1915)
Adisura atkinsoni Moore, 1881
Adrapsa ablualis Walker, 1859
Adrapsa mediana Wileman, 1915
Adrapsa notigera (Butler, 1879)
Adrapsa ochracea Leech, 1900
Adrapsa quadrilinealis (Wileman, 1914)
Adrapsa rivulata Leech, 1990
Adrapsa simplex (Butler, 1879)
Adrapsa subnotigera Owada, 1982
Aedia acronyctoides (Guenee, 1852)
Aedia flavescens (Butler, 1889)
Aedia leucomelas (Linnaeus, 1758)
Aedia obscura Wileman, 1914
Agrochola albirena (Chang, 1991)
Agrotis ipsilon (Hufnagel, 1766)
Agrotis segetum (Denis & Schiffermüller, 1775)
Agrotis taiwana B.S.Chang, 1991
Albocosta triangularis (Moore, 1867)
Aletia brunneicoccinea Calora, 1966
Aletia consanguis (Guenee, 1852)
Aletia fasciata (Moore, 1881)
Aletia ignita (Hampson, 1905)
Aletia limbopuncta (Strand, 1920)
Aletia longipinna B.S.Chang, 1991
Aletia mediana (Moore, 1881)
Aletia subplacida Sugi, 1977
Alloasteropetes olivacea Kishida & Machijima, 1994
Alloasteropetes paradisea Kishida & Owada, 2003
Allophyes miaoli Hreblay & Ronkay, 1997
Amphipyra acheron Draudt, 1950
Amphipyra averna Hreblay & Ronkay, 1997
Amphipyra deletaiwana Hreblay & Ronkay, 1998
Amphipyra formosana Hacker & Ronkay, 1998
Amphipyra fuscosa Chang, 1991
Amphipyra monolitha Felder & Rogenhofer, 1874
Amphipyra schrenckii Ménétriès, 1859
Amphipyra shryshana Chang, 1991
Amyna frontalis Strand, 1920
Amyna natalis (Walker, 1859)
Amyna octo (Guenee, 1852)
Amyna punctum (Fabricius, 1794)
Amyna stellata Bulter, 1878
Anachrostis indistincta Wileman & South, 1917
Anachrostis marginata Wileman & South, 1917
Anadevidia peponis (Fabricius, 1775)
Ananepa doda (Swinhoe, 1902)
Anaplectoides fuscivirens Sugi, 1995
Anaplectoides inouei Plante, 1987
Anaplectoides semivirens Ronkay & Ronkay, 1999
Anigraea rubida Walker, 1862
Anisoneura aluco (Fabricius, 1775)
Anisoneura salebrosa Guenee, 1852
Anodontodes rotunda Hampson, 1895
Anomis flava (Fabricius, 1775)
Anomis fulvida Guenee, 1852
Anomis involuta Walker, 1858
Anomis lyona (Swinhoe, 1919)
Anomis macronephra Holloway, 1982
Anomis mesogona (Walker, 1858)
Anomis nigritarsis (Walker, 1858)
Anomis privata (Walker, 1865)
Anoratha sinuosa Wileman, 1916
Anorthoa changi Ronkay & Ronkay, 2001
Anorthoa fabiani (Hrebley & Ronkay, 1998)
Anorthoa munda (Hreblay & Ronkay, 1998)
Antha grata (Butler, 1881)
Anticarsia irrorata (Fabricius, 1781)
Antivaleria viridentata Hreblay & Ronkay, 1997
Antoculeora yashimotoi Runkay, 1997
Anuga lunulata Moore, 1867
Anuga plicatrix Sugi, 1992
Apamea aquila Hreblay & Ronkay, 1997
Apamea fasciata (Leech, 1900)
Apamea lieni Hreblay, 1998
Apamea magnirena (Boursin, 1943)
Apamea rufus (B.S.Chang, 1911)
Apamea sodalis (Butler, 1878)
Apamea taiwana (Wileman, 1914)
Apospasta rantaizanensis (Wileman, 1915)
Apsarasa radians (Westwood, 1848)
Arasada kanshireiensis Wileman, 1916
Arcte coerula (Guenee, 1852)
Argyrogramma signata (Fabricius, 1792)
Artena dotata (Fabricius, 1794)
Asidemia albovitta Hreblay & Ronkay, 2000
Asota caricae (Fabricius, 1775)
Asota egens Jordan, 1897
Asota ficus (Fabricius, 1775)
Asota heliconia (Butler, 1877)
Asota plana (Butler, 1881)
Asota tortuosa (Moore, 1872)
Atacira affinis (Hampson, 1918)
Atacira lyncestides (Strand, 1920)
Athetis bremusa (Swinhoe)
Athetis confusa Wileman, 1915
Athetis hoengshana Han & Kononenko, 2011
Athetis lineosa (Moore, 1881)
Athetis placida (Moore, 1884)
Athetis speideli Kononenko, 2005
Athetis stellata (Moore, 1882)
Athetis stellulata B.S.Chang, 1911
Athetis taiwanensis Kononenko, 2005
Athetis theobroma (Hreblay & Ronkay, 1997)
Atrachea ochrotica (Hampson, 1910)
Atrachea viridinigra (Hreblay & Ronkay, 1997)
Attonda adspersa (Felder & Rogenhofer, 1874)
Auchmis inextricata (Moore, 1881)
Autoba tristalis (Leech, 1889)
Avatha bipartita (Wileman, 1915)
Avatha chinensis (Warren, 1913)
Avatha discolor (Fabricius, 1794)
Avitta fasciosa Moore, 1882
Avitta puncta Wileman, 1911
Avitta taiwana Wileman, 1915
Axylia putris (Linnaeus, 1761)
Bagada poliomera (Hampson, 1908)
Bastilla vitiensis Butler, 1886
Batracharta divisa Wileman, 1914
Bertula abjudicalis Walker, 1859
Bertula albipunctata Wileman, 1915
Bertula alpheusalis (Walker, [1859] 1858)
Bertula bidentata (Wileman, 1915)
Bertula bisectalis (Wileman, 1915)
Bertula centralis (Wileman, 1915)
Bertula hadenalis (Wileman, 1915)
Bertula incisa (Wileman, 1915)
Bertula kosemponica (Strand, 1917)
Bertula parallela (Leech, 1900)
Bertula quadripuncta (Wileman, 1915)
Bertula terminalis (Wileman, 1915)
Bertula venata (Leech, 1900)
Blasticorhinus bifasciata (Wileman, 1914)
Blasticorhinus enervis (Swinhoe, 1890)
Blasticorhinus kanshireiensis (Wileman, 1914)
Blasticorhinus rivulosa (Walker, 1865)
Blepharita alpestris B.S.Chang, 1991
Blepharita flavistigma (Moore, 1867)
Bocana manifestalis Walker, 1859
Bocula caradrinoides Guenee, 1852
Bocula diddisa (Swinhoe, 1890)
Bocula marginata Moore, 1882
Borsippa diffisa (Swinhoe, 1890)
Borsippa marginata Moore, 1882
Borsippa xanthostola (Hampson, 1926)
Brevipecten consanguis Leech, 1900
Britha biguttata Walker, 1866
Britha bilineata (Wileman, 1915)
Bryomoia melachlora (Staudinger, 1892)
Bryophila granitalis (Butler, 1881)
Bryophilina mollicula (Graeser, 1889)
Calesia dasypterus (Kollar, 1844)
Callopistria aethiops Bulter, 1878
Callopistria clava (Leech, 1900)
Callopistria deflexusa Chang, 1991
Callopistria delicata Chang, 1991
Callopistria duplicans Walker, 1858
Callopistria guttulalis Hampson, 1896
Callopistria japonibia Inoue & Sugi, 1958
Callopistria juventina (Stoll, 1782)
Callopistria maillardi (Guenée, 1862)
Callopistria nigrescens (Wileman, 1915)
Callopistria nobilior Eda, 2000
Callopistria phaeogona (Hampson, 1908)
Callopistria placodoides (Guenee, 1852)
Callopistria pulchrilinea (Walker, 1862)
Callopistria repleta Walker, 1858
Callopistria rivularis Walker, [1858] 1857
Callopistria thalpophiloides (Walker, 1862)
Callyna contracta Warren, 1913
Callyna jugaria Walker, 1858
Callyna monoleuca Walker, 1858
Callyna semivitta Moore, 1882
Calyptra fletcheri (Berio, 1955)
Calyptra minuticornis (Guenee, 1852)
Calyptra orthograpta (Butler, 1886)
Capnodes nigerrimasigna Strand, 1920
Carmara subcervina Walker, 1863
Catada pyralistis Strand, 1919
Catocala armandi Sugi, 1982
Catocala columbina Sugi, 1965
Catocala formosana Okano, 1958
Catocala intacta Sugi, 1965
Catocala kuangtungensis Mell, 1931
Catocala naganoi Sugi, 1982
Catocala nivea Owada, 1986
Catocala nupta (Linnaeus, 1767)
Catocala pataloides Mell, 1931
Catocala praegnax Kishida, 1981
Catocala tokui Sugi, 1976
Catocala wushensis Okano, 1964
Cerastis griseiorbis Hreblay & Ronkay, 1997
Cerynea igniaria (Hampson, 1898)
Chalciope mygdon (Cramer, 1777)
Chandata aglaja (Kishida & Yoshimoto, 1978)
Chandata taiwana Yoshimoto, 1982
Chasmina candida (Walker, 1865)
Chasmina nigripunctata (Bthune-Baker, 1908)
Chasminodes cilia (Staudinger, 1888)
Checupa stegeri Hreblay & Thöny, 1995
Chelonomorpha japana (Miyake, 1907)
Chlumetia transversa (Walker, 1865)
Chortodes cornutifera Hreblay & Ronkay, 1997
Chrysodeixis acuta (Walker, 1858)
Chrysodeixis eriosoma (Doubleday, 1843)
Chrysodeixis heberachis (Strand, 1920)
Chrysodeixis minutus Dufay, 1970
Chrysodeixis taiwani (Dufay, 1974)
Chusaris angulata Wileman, 1915
Chusaris compripalpis Strand, 1920
Chusaris dubiosa Strand, 1919
Chusaris microlepidopterana (Strand, 1920)
Chusaris nigromaculata (Wileman, 1915)
Chusaris sordida (Wileman & South, 1917)
Chytonix albiplaga Hampson, 1914
Chytonix costimacula Wileman, 1915
Chytonix umbrifera (Butler, 1889)
Chytonix variegata Wileman, 1914
Cidariplura bilineata (Wileman & South, 1919)
Cidariplura gladiata Butler, 1879
Cidariplura nigrisigna (Wileman, 1915)
Cidariplura signata Butler
Clavipalpula aurariae Ronkay, Ronkay, Gyulai & Hacker, 2010
Condate purpurea (Hampson, 1902)
Condica albigutta (Wileman, 1912)
Condica dolorosa (Walker, 1866)
Condica illecta (Walker, 1865)
Condica serva (Walker, 1858)
Conistra anonyma Hreblay & Ronkay, 1998
Conistra takasago Kishida & Yoshimoto, 1979
Conservula indica (Moore, 1867)
Corgatha tornalis Wileman, 1915
Cosmia achatina Bulter, 1879
Cosmia cara Bulter, 1881
Cosmia hanrongtzuooi Ronkay & Ronkay, 1999
Cosmia limacodina Sugi, 1997
Cosmia moderata (Staudinger, 1888)
Cosmia poecila Hreblay & Ronkay, 1997
Cosmia restituta Walker, 1857
Cosmia unicolor (Staudinger, 1892)
Craniophora fasciata (Moore, 1884)
Craniophora harmandi (Poujade, 1898)
Craniophora oda (Lattin, 1949)
Cretonia vegeta (Swinhoe, 1885)
Cruriopsis funebris Jordan, 1912
Cruxoruza decorata (Swinhoe, 1903)
Cryphia basichlora Kononenko, 1998
Cryphia granitalis (Butler, 1881)
Cryphia herczigi Hreblay & Ronkay, 2000
Cryphia hohuana Hreblay & Ronkay, 2000
Ctenoplusia adiaphora (Dufay, 1974)
Ctenoplusia agnata (Staudinger, 1892)
Ctenoplusia mutans (Walker, 1865)
Ctenoplusia albostriata (Bremer & Grey, 1852)
Ctenoplusia furcifera (Walker, 1857)
Ctenoplusia kosemponensis (Strand, 1920)
Ctenoplusia limbirena (Guenée, 1852)
Ctenoplusia placida (Moore, 1884)
Ctenoplusia sumbawana Behounek & Ronkay, 1999
Cucullia juntaichaoi Ronkay & Ronkay, 1999
Cyclodes omma (Hoeven, 1840)
Cymatophoropsis formosana (Matsumura, 1927)
Dactyloplusia impulsa (Walker, 1865)
Daddala lucilla (Butler, 1881)
Daseochaeta autumnalis Chang, 1991
Diarsia arenosoides Poole, 1989
Diarsia canescens (Butler, 1878)
Diarsia carnipennis B.S.Chang, 1991
Diarsia cia (Strand, 1919)
Diarsia formosana Boursin, 1948
Diarsia formosensis (Hampson, 1914)
Diarsia macrodactyla Boursin, 1954
Diarsia nigrafasciata B.S.Chang, 1991
Diarsia nigrosigna (Moore, 1881)
Diarsia sinuosa (Wileman, 1912)
Diarsia subtincta Chang, 1991
Diarsia taidactyla Varga & Ronkay, 2007
Diarsia unica Plante, 1994
Diarsia yoshimotoi Plante, 1994
Dictyestra dissecta (Walker, 1865)
Dierna duplicata Sugi, 1992
Dinumma deponens Walker, 1858
Dinumma placens Walker, 1858
Diomea discoinsigna (Strand, 1920)
Diomea insulana Yoshimoto, 2001
Diomea jankowskii (Oberthur, 1880)
Diomea stellata Wileman, 1916
Diomea suvarnadivpae (Kobes, 1983)
Diphtherocome pulchra (Wileman, 1912)
Dipterygina cupreotincta Sugi, 1954
Dipterygina indica (Moore, 1867)
Donda siitanae (Remm, 1983)
Dryobotodes caerulescens Ronkay & Ronkay, 2001
Dryobotodes formosanus Hreblay & Ronkay, 1997
Dunira diplogramma (Hampson, 1912)
Dypterygia subfusca (Wileman, 1912)
Dysgonia absentimacula (Guenee, 1852)
Dysgonia acuta (Moore, 1883)
Dysgonia amygdalis Moore, 1887
Dysgonia analis (Guenee, 1852)
Dysgonia arctotaenia (Guenee, 1852)
Dysgonia arcuata (Moore, 1887)
Dysgonia dulcis (Butler, 1878)
Dysgonia fulvotaenia (Guenee, 1852)
Dysgonia illibata (Fabricius, 1775)
Dysgonia joviana (Stoll, 1782)
Dysgonia maturata (Walker, 1858)
Dysgonia onelia (Guenee, 1852)
Dysgonia palumba (Guenee, 1852)
Dysgonia praetermissa (Warren, 1913)
Dysgonia rigidistria (Guenee, 1852)
Dysgonia simillima (Guenee, 1852)
Dysgonia stuposa (Fabricius, 1794)
Eclipsea subapicalis (Swinhoe, 1905)
Ecpatia longinquuva (Swinhoe, 1890)
Ectogoniella pangraptalis Strand, 1920
Edessena gentiusalis Walker, 1859
Egira acronyctoides (Wileman, 1914)
Egiropolia kingmana Ronkay & Ronkay, 2001
Egnasia nagadeboides Strand, 1920
Elusa ustula Hampson, 1909
Elwesia sugii Hreblay & Ronkay, 1998
Enispa bilineata Wileman, 1916
Enispa terminipuncta (Wileman, 1916)
Entomogramma fautrix Guenee, 1852
Episparis taiwana Wileman & West, 1929
Episteme adulatrix (Sonan, 1941)
Episteme beatrix Matsumura, 1910
Episteme lectrix (Mell, 1938)
Ercheia cyllaria (Cramer, 1779)
Ercheia niveostrigata Warren, 1913
Ercheia umbrosa Bulter, 1881
Erebus albicincta (Wileman, 1923)
Erebus caprimulgus (Fabricius, 1781)
Erebus ephesperis (Hübner, 1823)
Erebus gemmans (Guenee, 1852)
Erebus macrops (Linnaeus, 1768)
Erebus pilosa (Leech, 1900)
Ericeia eriophora (Guenee, 1852)
Ericeia inangulata (Guenee, 1852)
Ericeia pertendens (Walker, 1858)
Ericeia subcinerea (Snellen, 1880)
Erygia apicalis Guenee, 1852
Erythroplusia pyropia (Butler, 1879)
Estagrotis tibori Hreblay & Ronkay, 1997
Eublemma anachoresis (Wallengren, 1863)
Eublemma baccalix (Swinhoe, 1896)
Eublemma cochylioides (Guenee, 1852)
Eublemma conspersa (Butler, 1880)
Eublemma dimidialis (Fabricius, 1794)
Eublemma quadrapex (Hampson, 1891)
Eublemma ragusana (Freyer, 1845)
Eublemma rivula (Moore, 1882)
Eublemma terminimaculata Wileman, 1915
Eudocima homaena (Hübner, 1823)
Eudocima okurai (Okano, 1964)
Eudocima phalonia (Linnaeus, 1763)
Eudocima salaminia (Cramer, 1777)
Eudocima tyrannus (Guenée, 1852)
Eugraptoblemma pictalis (Hampson, 1898)
Euplexia albirena Wileman, 1914
Euplexia amblypennis Strand, 1920
Euplexia chlorerythra Swinhoe, 1895
Euplexia lucipara (Linnaeus, 1758)
Euplexidia angusta Yoshimoto, 1987
Euplexidia exotica Yoshimoto, 1987
Euplexidia pallidivirens Yoshimoto, 1987
Euplocia membliaria (Cramer, 1780)
Eupsilia baoshinchangi Fu, Tzuoo & Owada, 2008
Eupsilia confusa Owada & Kobayashi, 1993
Eupsilia contracta (Butler, 1878)
Eupsilia shyu Chang, 1991
Eupsilia strigifera Bulter, 1879
Eupsilia tripunctata Butler, 1878
Eupsilia virescens Yoshimoto, 1985
Euromoia subpulchra (Alphéraky, 1897)
Eutelia adulatricoides (Mell, 1943)
Eutelia geyeri (Felder & Rogenhofer, 1874)
Eutelia hamulatrix Draudt, 1950
Eutrogia morosa (Moore, 1882)
Euwilemania angulata (Wileman, 1911)
Exsula dentatrix Miyake, 1907
Extremoplusia megaloba (Hampson, 1912)
Fabiania pulla Hreblay & Ronkay, 2000
Feliniopsis asahinai (Sugi, 1982)
Feliniopsis indistans (Guenee, 1852)
Feliniopsis tripunctata (Chang, 1991)
Fodina contigua Wileman, 1914
Gerbathodes paupera (Staudinger, 1892)
Gesonia obeditalis Walker, 1859
Gigatelorta herois (Kobayashi, 2003)
Goniocraspedon mistura (Swinhoe, 1891)
Goniocraspidum pryeri (Leech, 1889)
Gonoglasa contigua (Wileman, 1915)
Gortyna flavina Hreblay & Ronkay, 1997
Gortyna plumibitincta Hreblay & Ronkay, 1997
Grammodes geometrica (Fabricius, 1775)
Hadennia hisbonalis (Walker, [1859] 1858)
Hadennia hypenalis (Walker, [1859] 1858)
Hadennia mysalis (Walker, 1859)
Hadennia nakatanii Owada, 1979
Hadjina chinensis (Wallengren, 1865)
Hamodes pendleburyi Prout, 1932
Hamodes propitia (Boisduval, 1832)
Heliothis armigera (Hübner, 1808)
Heliothis assulta Guenee, 1852
Hemictenophora euplexiodes Ronkay & Ronkay, 1999
Hemiglaea albolineata Owada, 1993
Hemiglaea costalis (Butler, 1879)
Hemiglaea eupompa Ronkay & Ronkay, 1999
Hemiglaea radiata Hreblay & Ronkay, 2000
Hemiglaea horei horei Owada, 1993
Hepatica indentalis (Wileman, 1915)
Hepatica irrorata (Wileman & South, 1917)
Herminia grisealis (Denis & Schiffermüller, 1775)
Herminia kurokoi (Owada, 1987)
Herminia vermiculata (Leech, 1900)
Hermonassa formontana Hreblay & Ronkay, 1997
Hermonassa hemicyclia Plante, 1994
Hermonassa inconstans Wileman, 1912
Hermonassa legraini Plante, 1994
Hermonassa planeti Hreblay & Ronkay, 1997
Himalistra soluta Hreblay & Ronkay, 1997
Hipoepa biasalis (Walker, 1859)
Hipoepa fractalis (Guenee, 1854)
Holocryptis nymphula (Rebel, 1909)
Hoplodrina implacata (Wileman & South, 1929)
Houlberthosia ornatissma (Wileman, 1911)
Hulodes caranea (Cramer, 1780)
Hyalobole changae Owada, 1994
Hyalobole kononenkoi Hreblay & Ronkay, 1997
Hydrillodes gravatalis (Walker, 1859)
Hydrillodes hemusalis (Walker, 1859)
Hydrillodes lentalis Guenee, 1854
Hydrillodes pseudomorosa Strand, 1920
Hydrillodes wilemani Owada 1992
Hypena albopunctalis (Leech, 1889)
Hypena amica (Bulter, 1878)
Hypena angustalis (Warren, 1913)
Hypena assimilis Hampson, 1891
Hypena conscitalis Walker, 1866
Hypena cruca (Strand, 1920)
Hypena depalpis Strand, 1920
Hypena desquamata (Strand, 1920)
Hypena dichromialis Strand, 1920
Hypena furva Wileman, 1911
Hypena iconicalis Walker, 1859
Hypena indicatalis Walker, 1859
Hypena indistincta Wileman, 1915
Hypena kanshireiensis Wileman, 1916
Hypena lignealis Walker, 1866
Hypena napa Strand, 1920
Hypena napana Strand, 1920
Hypena occata Hampson, 1882
Hypena parva (Wileman, 1916)
Hypena perspicua (Leech, 1900)
Hypena pmpeterseni Strand, 1920
Hypena poa Strand, 1920
Hypena sagitta (Fabricius, 1775)
Hypena satsumalis Leech, 1889
Hypena sinuosa Wileman, 1911
Hypena strigatus (Fabricius, 1798)
Hypena subcyanea Butler, 1881
Hypena taiwana (Wileman, 1915)
Hypena tenebralis (Strand, 1920)
Hypena trigonalis (Guenee, 1854)
Hypena zillana Strand, 1920
Hypenagonia angulata Wileman, 1915
Hypenagonia bipuncta Wileman, 1915
Hypenagonia mediifascia Wileman & South, 1917
Hypenagonia minor Wileman, 1915
Hypenagonia obliquifascia Wileman & South, 1917
Hypenagonia subsffusata Wileman & West, 1930
Hypenagonia vexatariola (Strand, 1920)
Hypercodia rubritincta Wileman & South, 1916
Hyperlophoides compactilis (Swinhoe, 1890)
Hyperstrotia flavipuncta (Leech, 1889)
Hyperstrotia ochreipuncta (Wileman, 1914)
Hypersypnoides formosensis (Hampson, 1926)
Hypersypnoides moltrechti Berio, 1958
Hypersypnoides punctosa (Walker, 1865)
Hypersypnoides quadrinotata (Leech, 1900)
Hypersypnoides submarginata (Walker, 1865)
Hypersypnoides umbrosa (Butler, 1881)
Hypocala deflorata (Fabricius, 1794)
Hypocala rostrata (Fabricius, 1794)
Hypocala subsatura Guenee, 1852
Hypocala violacea Bulter, 1879
Hypopyra ossigera Guenee, 1852
Hypopyra pudens Walker, 1858
Hypopyra vespertilio (Fabricius, 1787)
Hyposada assimilis Warren, 1914
Hyposada fasciosa (Moore, 1888)
Hyposemansis albipunctata (Wileman, 1914)
Hyposemansis singha Guenee, 1852
Hypospila bolinoides Guenee, 1852
Hypospila creberrima (Walker, 1858)
Idia fulvipicta (Butler, 1889)
Idia satyrata (Strand, 1920)
Ipimorpha guanyuana B.S.Chang, 1991
Ischyja ferrifracta (Walker, 1864)
Isoura fuscicollis (Butler, 1889)
Itmaharela basalis (Moore, 1882)
Karana gemmifera (Walker, 1858)
Karana hoenei Hreblay & Ronkay, 2000
Koyaga virescens (Sugi, 1958)
Koyaga viriditincta (Wileman, 1915)
Lacera procellosa Bulter, 1879
Laspyria ruficeps (Walker, 1864)
Latirostrum bisacutum Hampson, 1895
Leiostola tortricodia (Strand, 1920)
Leucania percussa Bulter, 1880
Leucania roseilinea Walker, 1862
Leucania substriata Yoshimatsu, 1987
Leucapamea chienmingfui Ronkay & Ronkay, 1999
Leucapamea formosensis (Hampson, 1910)
Leucapamea tsueyluana Chang, 1991
Leucocosmia thoracica (Moore, 1884)
Lithophane trimorpha Hreblay & Ronkay, 1997
Lithophane venusta Yoshimoto, 1988
Lithopolia confusa (Wileman, 1914)
Lophomilia polybapta (Butler, 1879)
Lophonycta neoconfusa Chang, 1991
Lophoptera hemithyris (Hampson, 1905)
Lophoptera illucida (Walker, 1865)
Lophoptera longipennis (Moore, 1882)
Lophoptera nama (Swinhoe, 1900)
Lophoptera squammigera Guenee, 1852
Lophoptera vittigera Walker, 1865
Lophoruza albicostalis (Leech, 1889)
Lophoruza lunifera (Moore, 1885)
Loxioda similis (Moore, 1882)
Luceria fletcheri Inoue, 1958
Luceria oculalis (Moore, 1877)
Lygephila kishidai Kinoshita, 1989
Lygephila yoshimotoi Kinoshita, 1989
Lygniodes hypoleuca Guenee, 1852
Macdunnoughia tetragona (Walker, 1857)
Maikona jezoensis Kishida, 1987
Maliattha arefacta (Butler, 1879)
Maliattha picata Bulter, 1889
Maliattha picatina (Prout, 1932)
Maliattha separata Walker, 1863
Maliattha signifera (Walker, 1857)
Maliattha vialis (Moore, 1882)
Maliattha volodia Ronkay & Sohn, 2004
Mamestra brassicae (Linnaeus, 1758)
Mamestra tayulingensis Yoshimoto, 1989
Mataeomera biangulata (Wileman, 1915)
Maxera arizanensis (Wileman, 1914)
Mecodina albodentata (Swinhoe, 1895)
Mecodina cineracea (Butler, 1879)
Mecodina inconspicua (Wileman & South, 1916)
Mecodina karapinensis Strand, 1920
Mecodina subcostalis (Walker, 1865)
Megaloctena mandarina (Leech, 1900)
Meganephra cinerea Kobayashi & Owada, 1996
Meganephra crassa Kobayashi & Owada, 1996
Meganephra debilis Kobayashi & Owada, 1996
Meganephra funesta (Leech, 1889)
Meganephra laxa Kobayashi & Owada, 1996
Meganephra weixleri Hreblay & Ronkay, 1997
Mesocrapex punkikonis Matsumura, 1929
Mesorhynchaglaea tarokoensis Sugi, 1990
Metaemene atrigutta (Leech, 1889)
Metaemene hampsoni Wileman, 1914
Metaphoenia incongrualis (Walker, 1859)
Metaphoenia plagifera (Walker, 1864)
Metopta rectifasciata (Menetries, 1863)
Micreremites siculipalpis (Strand, 1920)
Microxyla confusa (Wileman, 1911)
Mimeusemia vilemani Hampson, 1911
Mixomelia rivulosa (Wileman, 1915)
Mniotype aulombardi Plante, 1994
Mocis annetta (Butler, 1878)
Mocis dolosa (Butler, 1881)
Mocis frugalis (Fabricius, 1775)
Mocis undata (Fabricius, 1775)
Moma abbreviata (Sugi, 1968)
Moma murrhina Graeser, 1889
Mosopia punctilinea (Wileman, 1915)
Mythimna loreyi (Duponchel, 1827)
Mythimna martoni Yoshimatsu & Legrain, 2001
Mythimna argentata Hreblay & Yoshimatsu, 1998
Mythimna bistrigata (Moore, 1881)
Mythimna changi (Sugi, 1992)
Mythimna decisissima (Walker, 1865)
Mythimna epieixelus (Rothschild, 1920)
Mythimna exsanguis (Guenee, 1852)
Mythimna formosicola Yoshimatsu, 1994
Mythimna hamifera (Walker, 1862)
Mythimna hannemanni (Yoshimatsu, 1991)
Mythimna hirashimai Yoshimatsu, 1994
Mythimna intertexta (Chang, 1991)
Mythimna pulchra (Snellen, [1886])
Mythimna purpurpatagis (Chang, 1991)
Mythimna simplex (Leech, 1889)
Mythimna plantei Hreblay & Yoshimatsu, 1996
Mythimna snelleni Hreblay, 1996
Mythimna stolida (Leech, 1889)
Mythimna albomarginata Yoshimatsu, 1994
Mythimna bani (Sugi, 1977)
Mythimna byssina (Swinhoe, 1886)
Mythimna celebensis (Tams, 1935)
Mythimna compta (Moore, 1881)
Mythimna curvilinea (Hampson, 1891)
Mythimna divergens Butler, 1878
Mythimna formosana (Butler, 1880)
Mythimna guanyuana (Chang, 1991)
Mythimna insularis (Butler, 1880)
Mythimna irregularis (Walker, 1857)
Mythimna lishana (Chang, 1991)
Mythimna lucida Yoshimatsu & Hreblay, 1996
Mythimna percussa (Butler, 1880)
Mythimna polysticha (Turner, 1902)
Mythimna radiata (Bremer, 1861)
Mythimna rushanensis Yoshimatsu, 1994
Mythimna simillima (Walker, 1862)
Mythimna sinuosa (Moore, 1882)
Mythimna subplacida (Sugi, 1977)
Mythimna taiwana (Wileman, 1912)
Mythimna tangala (Felder & Rogenhofer, 1874)
Mythimna venalba (Moore, 1867)
Mythimna yu (Guenee, 1852)
Mythimna pallidicosta (Hampson, 1894)
Mythimna separata (Walker, 1865)
Mythimna arizanensis (Wileman, 1915)
Mythimna nigrilinea (Leech, 1889)
Naarda blepharota (Strand, 1920)
Naarda ochronota Wileman, 1915
Nacna malachitis (Oberthur, 1880)
Nagadeba indecoralis Walker, [1866]1865
Nagadeba obenbergeri Strand, 1919
Naranga aenescens Moore, 1881
Neachrostia leechi Wileman, 1915
Neachrostia limbata Wileman, 1915
Neochiera dominia (Cramer, 1780)
Nepalopolia contaminata (Chang, 1991)
Neustrotia noloides (Butler, 1879)
Neustrotia rectilineata Ueda, 1987
Niaccaba sumptualis Walker, 1866
Niphonyx segregata (Butler, 1878)
Nodaria externalis Guenee, 1854
Nodaria zemella (Strand, 1920)
Nycticia strigidisca (Moore, 1881)
Nycticia variabilis (Owada, 1983)
Nyctycia adnivis Kobayashi & Owada, 1998
Nyctycia endoi (Owada, 1983)
Nyctycia mesomelana Kobayashi & Hreblay, 1998
Nyctycia signa Hreblay & Ronkay, 2000
Nyctycia simonyii Hreblay, 1998
Nyctycia stenoptera Kobayashi, 1998
Nyctycia strigidisca Kobayashi, 1998
Nyctyciomorpha plagiogramma (Hampson, 1906)
Ochropleura praecox (Linnaeus, 1758)
Odontestra laszlogabi Hreblay & Ronkay, 2000
Oglasa costimacula Wileman, 1915
Oglasa mediopallens Wileman & South, 1917
Oglasa sordida (Wileman, 1915)
Olivenebula monticola Kishida & Yoshimoto, 1977
Olivenebula oberthueri (Staudinger, 1892)
Olulis puncticinctalis Walker, 1863
Ommatophora luminosa (Cramer, 1780)
Ophisma gravata Guenee, 1852
Ophiusa coronata (Fabricius, 1775)
Ophiusa disjungens (Walker, 1858)
Ophiusa microtirhaca Sugi, 1990
Ophiusa olista (Swinhoe, 1893)
Ophiusa tirhaca (Cramer, 1777)
Ophiusa trapezium (Guenee, 1852)
Ophiusa triphaenoides (Walker, 1858)
Ophthalmis lincea Jordan, 1912
Oraesia emarginata (Fabricius, 1794)
Oroplexia fortunata Hreblay & Ronkay, 1997
Oroplexia variegata Hreblay & Ronkay, 1997
Orthosia alishana Sugi, 1986
Orthosia atriluna Ronkay & Ronkay, 1999
Orthosia carnipennis (Butler, 1878)
Orthosia castanea Sugi, 1986
Orthosia conspecta (Wileman, 1914)
Orthosia kurosawai Sugi, 1986
Orthosia limbata (Butler, 1879)
Orthosia lushana Sugi, 1986
Orthosia munda (Denis & Schiffermüller, 1775)
Orthosia nigromaculata (Hone, 1917)
Orthosia perfusca Sugi, 1986
Orthozona curvilineata Wileman, 1915
Orthozona karapina Strand, 1920
Oruza albigutta Wileman, 1914
Oruza brunnea (Leech, 1900)
Oruza divisa (Walker, 1862)
Oruza glaucotorna Hampson, 1910
Oruza lacteicosta (Hampson, 1897)
Oruza stragulata (Pagenstecher, 1900)
Oxyodes scrobiculata (Fabricius, 1775)
Ozana chinensis (Leech, 1900)
Ozarba bipars Hampson, 1865
Ozarba brunnea (Leech, 1900)
Ozarba ochritincta Wileman, 1916
Ozarba punctigera Walker, 1865
Ozarba uberosa (Swinhoe, 1885)
Paectes cristatrix (Guenee, 1852)
Pangrapta adusta (Leech, 1900)
Pangrapta albistigma (Hampson, 1898)
Pangrapta costinotata (Butler, 1881)
Pangrapta lunulata Sterz, 1915
Pangrapta plumbilineata Wileman & West, 1929
Pangrapta trilineata (Leech, 1900)
Panilla constipunctata Leech, 1900
Panilla dispila (Walker, 1865)
Panilla mila Strand, 1920
Panilla minor Yoshimoto, 2001
Panolis exquisita Draudt, 1950
Panolis pinicortex Hreblay & Ronkay, 1997
Panolis variegatoides Poole, 1989
Pantydia metaspila (Walker, 1858)
Papuacola costalis (Moore, 1883)
Paracolax angulata (Wileman, 1915)
Paracolax apicimacula (Wileman, 1915)
Paracolax bilineata (Wileman, 1915)
Paracolax fentoni (Butler, 1879)
Paracolax pryeri (Butler, 1879)
Paracolax sugii Owada, 1992
Paracolax unicolor Wileman & South, 1917
Paragona dubia Wileman, 1916
Paurophylla bidentata (Wileman, 1915)
Penicillaria jocosatrix Guenee, 1852
Penicillaria maculata Bulter, 1889
Penicillaria simplex (Walker, 1865)
Perciana marmorea Walker, 1865
Perciana taiwana Wileman, 1911
Pericyma basalis Wileman & South, 1916
Pericyma cruegeri (Butler, 1886)
Pericyma glaucinans (Guenee, 1852)
Peridroma saucia (Hübner, 1808)
Perigrapha nigrocincta Hreblay & Ronkay, 1997
Perinaenia accipiter (Felder & Rogenhofer, 1874)
Perinaenia mingchyrica Babics & Ronkay, 2011
Phalga clarirena (Sugi, 1982)
Phlogophora albovittata (Moore, 1867)
Phlogophora clava (Wileman, 1912)
Phlogophora conservuloides (Hampson, 1898)
Phyllodes eyndhovii Vollenhoven, 1858
Pilipectus taiwanus Wileman, 1915
Plataplecta pulverosa Hreblay & Ronkay, 1997
Platyja acerces (Prout, 1928)
Platyja umminia (Cramer, 1780)
Plecoptera reflexa Guenee, 1852
Plecoptera uniformis (Moore, 1882)
Plexiphleps stellifera (Moore, 1882)
Plusiodonta coelonota (Kollar, 1844)
Plusiopalpa adrasta Strand, 1920
Polia adustaeoides Draeseke, 1928
Polia goliath (Oberthur, 1880)
Polia mortua Hreblay & Ronkay, 1997
Polydesma boarmoides Guenee, 1852
Polypogon decipiens (Hampson, 1898)
Potnyctycia cristifera Hreblay & Ronkay, 1997
Potnyctycia nemesi Ronkay & Ronkay, 2001
Potnyctycia taiwana (Chang, 1991)
Progonia brunnealis (Wileman & South, 1916)
Progonia olieusalis (Walker, 1859)
Prolophota trigonifera Hampson, 1896
Protodeltote distinguenda (Staudinger, 1888)
Protodeltote pygarga (Hufnagel, 1766)
Pseuderiopus albiscripta (Hampson, 1898)
Pseudeustrotia bipartita (Wileman, 1914)
Pseudodeltote coenia (Swinhoe, 1901)
Pseudodeltote formosana (Hampson, 1910)
Pseudodeltote postvittata (Wileman, 1914)
Pseudodeltote subcoenia (Wileman & South, 1916)
Pseudogyrtona marmorea (Wileman, 1916)
Pseudogyrtona ochreopuncta Wileman & South, 1916
Pseudopanolis flavimacula (Wileman, 1912)
Pseudopanolis lala Owada, 1994
Pseudosphetta moorei (Cotes & Swinhoe, 1887)
Psimada quadripennis Walker, 1858
Pygopteryx fulva Chang, 1991
Pyrrhia bifasciata (Staudinger, 1888)
Pyrrhidivalva sordida (Butler, 1881)
Raparna sordida (Wileman & South, 1916)
Rema costimacula (Guenee, 1852)
Rhesala imparata Walker, 1858
Rhynchaglaea hemixantha Sugi, 1980
Rhynchaglaea leuteomixta Hreblay & Ronkay, 1998
Rhynchaglaea perscitula Kobayashi & Owada, 2006
Rhynchaglaea taiwana Sugi, 1980
Rhynchaglaea terngjyi Chang, 1991
Rivula arizanensis Wileman & South, 1916
Rivula basalis Hampson, 1891
Rivula cognata Hampson, 1912
Rivula curvifera Walker, 1862
Rivula leucanioides (Walker, 1863)
Rivula niveipuncta Swinhoe, 1905
Sarbanissa cirrha (Jordan, 1912)
Sarbanissa interposita (Hampson, 1910)
Sarbanissa subflava (Moore, 1877)
Sarcopolia illoba (Butler, 1878)
Sarcopteron punctimargo Hampson, 1893
Sasunaga interrupta Warren, 1912
Sasunaga longiplaga Warren, 1912
Sasunaga tenebrosa (Moore, 1867)
Scedopla umbrosa (Wileman, 1916)
Schrankia seinoi Inoue, 1979
Sclerogenia jessica (Butler, 1878)
Scoliopteryx libatrix (Linnaeus, 1758)
Scriptoplusia nigriluna (Walker, 1858)
Semiothisops macariata (Hampson, 1902)
Serrodes campana Guenee, 1852
Sesamia inferens (Walker, 1858)
Sesamia nigropunctata (Wileman, 1912)
Sesamia punctilinea (Wileman, 1912)
Sesamia punctivena (Wileman, 1914)
Sesamia submarginalis (Hampson, 1891)
Sesamia turpis Bulter, 1879
Sideridis honeyi (Yoshimoto, 1989)
Sigmuncus albigrisea (Warren, 1914)
Simplicia bimarginata (Walker, 1863)
Simplicia caeneusalis (Walker, 1859)
Simplicia formosana (Strand, 1919)
Simplicia mistacalis (Guenee, 1854)
Simplicia niphona (Butler, 1878)
Simplicia similis (Moore, 1882)
Simplicia simplicissima Wileman & West, 1930
Simplicia unipuncta (Wileman, 1915)
Simplicia xanthoma Prout, 1928
Simplicia zanclognathalis (Strand, 1920)
Sinarella interrupta (Wileman, 1915)
Sinarella itoi Owada, 1987
Sinarella nigrisigna (Leech, 1900)
Sineugraphe rhytidoprocta Boursin, 1954
Sophta diplochorda (Hampson, 1907)
Sophta olivata (Hampson, 1902)
Speidelia formosa Ronkay, 2000
Speidelia taiwana (Wileman, 1915)
Speiredonia mutabilis Fabricius, 1792
Speiredonia zamis (Stoll, 1780)
Sphragifera biplagiata (Walker, 1865)
Sphragifera sigillata Hreblay & Ronkay, 2000
Spirama helicina (Hübner, 1831)
Spirama retorta (Clerck, 1759)
Spodoptera cilium Guenee, 1852
Spodoptera connexa (Wileman, 1914)
Spodoptera exigua (Hübner, 1808)
Spodoptera litura (Fabricius, 1775)
Spodoptera mauritia (Boisduval, 1833)
Spodoptera pecten Guenee, 1852
Spodoptera picta (Guerin-Meneville, 1838)
Squamipalpis subnubila Leech
Stenhypena costalis Wileman & South, 1916
Stenoloba assimilis Kononenko & Ronkay, 2000
Stenoloba clarescens Kononenko & Ronkay, 2000
Stenoloba domina Kononenko & Ronkay, 2000
Stenoloba lichenosa Kononenko & Ronkay, 2001
Stenoloba manleyi (Leech, 1889)
Stenoloba manleyi Kononenko & Ronkay, 2000
Stenoloba nigrabasalis B.S.Chang, 1991
Stenoloba nora Kononenko & Ronkay, 2001
Stenoloba olivacea (Wileman, 1914)
Stenoloba pulla Ronkay, 2001
Stenoloba rufosagitta Kononenko & Ronkay, 2001
Stenoloba yenminia Ronkay, 2001
Stigmoctenoplusia aeneofusa (Hampson, 1894)
Subleuconycta palshkovi (Filipjev, 1937)
Subleuconycta sugii Boursin, 1962
Sugia rufa Ueda, 1987
Sugitania chengshinglini Owada & Tzuoo, 2010
Sugitania uenoi Owada, 1995
Sympis rufibasis Guenee, 1852
Sypna diversa Wileman & South, 1917
Sypnoides chinensis Berio, 1958
Sypnoides hampsoni (Wileman & South, 1917)
Sypnoides pannosa (Moore, 1882)
Sypnoides simplex (Leech, 1900)
Taeneremina scripta Ronkay & Ronkay, 2001
Taipsaphida curiosa Ronkay & Ronkay, 1999
Taivaleria rubrifasciata Hreblay & Ronkay, 2000
Tamba lala Swinhoe, 1900
Tamba nagadeboides (Strand, 1920)
Tamba nigrilineata (Wileman, 1915)
Tamba parallela (Wileman, 1915)
Tamba taiwana Yoshimoto, 2002
Tamba venusta (Hampson, 1898)
Taralla delatrix (Guenee, 1852)
Telorta atrifusa Hreblay & Ronkay, 1997
Telorta obscura Yoshimoto, 1987
Telorta shenhornyeni Ronkay & Kobayashi, 1997
Telorta yazakii Yoshimoto, 1987
Teratoglaea pacifica Sugi, 1958
Thalatta fasciosa Moore, 1882
Thyas honesta Hübner, 1824
Thyas juno (Dalman, 1823)
Thysanoplusia daubei (Boisduval, 1840)
Thysanoplusia intermixta (Warren, 1913)
Thysanoplusia orichalcea (Fabricius, 1775)
Thysanoplusia reticulata (Moore, 1882)
Tiliacea melonina (Chang, 1991)
Tipasa renalis (Moore, [1885]1887)
Tiracola aureata Holloway, 1989
Tiracola plagiata (Fabricius, 1857)
Tolpia myops Hampson, 1907
Trachea auriplena (Walker, 1857)
Trachea conjuncta Wileman, 1914
Trachea punkikonis Matsumura, 1929
Trichoplusia ni (Hübner, 1803)
Trigonodes hyppasia (Cramer, 1779)
Triphaena fuscicollis Butler, 1889
Triphaenopsis jezoensis Sugi, 1962
Tycracona obliqua Moore, 1882
Ulotrichopus macula (Hampson, 1891)
Virgo major Kishida & Yoshimoto, 1991
Wittstrotia taroko Speidel & Behounek, 2005
Xanthia tatachana Chang, 1991
Xanthodes albago (Fabricius, 1794)
Xanthodes intersepta Guenee, 1852
Xanthodes transversa Guenee, 1852
Xanthoptera apoda Strand, 1920
Xenotrachea albidisca (Moore, 1867)
Xenotrachea irrorata Yoshimoto, 1992
Xestia efflorescens (Butler, 1879)
Xestia flavilinea (Wileman, 1912)
Xestia fuscostigma Hreblay & Ronkay, 2000
Xestia semiherbida (Walker, 1857)
Xestia tamsi (Wileman & West, 1929)
Xestia vidua (Staudinger, 1892)
Xestia yamanei Chang, 1991
Xylena changi Horie, 1993
Xylena consimilis Sugi, 1992
Xylena griseithorax Sugi, 1992
Xylena lignipennis Sugi, 1992
Xylena plumbeopaca Hreblay & Ronkay, 2000
Xylena sugii Kobayashi, 1993
Xylena tanabei Owada, 1993
Xylena tatajiana Chang, 1991
Xylopolia bella Hreblay & Ronkay, 2000
Xylopolia fulvireniforma Chang, 1991
Xylostola indistincta (Moore, 1882)
Yula muscosa (Hampson, 1891)
Zanclognatha angulina (Leech, 1900)
Zanclognatha helva (Butler, 1879)
Zanclognatha inspidalis (Wileman, 1915)
Zanclognatha nakatomii Owada, 1977
Zanclognatha nigrisigna (Wileman, 1915)
Zanclognatha reticulatis (Leech, 1900)
Zanclognatha subtriplex Strand, 1919
Zanclognatha tarsipennalis (Treitschke, 1835)
Zanclognatha yaeyamalis Owada, 1977
Zethes fuboshona Strand, 1920
Zonoplusia ochreata (Walker, 1865)
Zurobata vacillans (Walker, 1864)

Nolidae
Aiteta musculina Walker, 1856
Beara tortriciformis (Strand, 1917)
Blenina angulipennis (Moore, 1882)
Blenina chlorophila Hampson, 1905
Blenina puloa Swinhoe
Blenina quinaria Moore
Blenina senex (Butler, 1878)
Camptoloma carum Kishida
Carea internifusca Hampson
Carea trimacula (Strand, 1920)
Carea varipes Walker, [1857]
Characoma ruficirra (Hampson, 1905)
Clethrophora distincta (Leech, 1889)
Dilophothripoides noliformis Strand
Earias cupreoviridis (Walker, 1862)
Earias flavida Felder
Earias insulana (Boisduval, 1833)
Earias punctaria Wileman
Earias roseifera Bulter
Earias vittella (Fabricius, 1794)
Eligma narcissus (Cramer, 1775)
Evonima aperta Walker
Evonima elegans Inoue
Gabala argentata Bulter
Gabala roseoretis Kobes
Gadirtha pulchra Butler, 1886
Gelastocera exusta Bulter
Hylophilodes esakii Fukushima
Hylophilodes rara Fukushima
Hylophilodes tsukusensis Nagano
Iragaodes nobilis (Staudinger, 1892)
Iscadia inexacta (Walker, 1858)
Iscadia uniformis Warren
Kerala lentiginosa Wileman, 1914
Labanda semipars (Walker, 1858)
Macrobarasa xantholopha (Hampson, 1896)
Macrochthonia fervens Bulter
Meganola albula (Denis & Schiffermüller, 1775)
Meganola argentalis (Wileman & South, 1916)
Meganola ascripta (Hampson, 1894)
Meganola diversalis Inoue
Meganola major Inoue
Meganola melanomedia Inoue
Meganola nitida (Hampson, 1894)
Meganola phaeochroa (Hampson, 1900)
Meganola pseudohypena Inoue
Meganola pulverata (Wileman & West, 1929)
Meganola simplex (Wileman & West, 1929)
Meganola suisharyonensis (Strand, 1917)
Meganola tesselata (Hampson, 1896)
Meganola triangulalis (Leech, 1889)
Miaromima kobesi (Sugi, 1991)
Nanaguna sordida Wileman
Narangodes argyrostrigatus Sugi
Narangodes confluens Sugi
Narangodes flavibasis Sugi
Negeta signata (Walker, 1864)
Negritothripa hompsoni (Wileman, 1911)
Nola ceylonica Hampson
Nola fasciata (Walker, 1866)
Nola formosalesa (Wileman & West, 1928)
Nola fuscimarginalis Wileman
Nola innocua Bulter
Nola kanshireiensis (Wileman & South, 1916)
Nola marginata Hampson
Nola nephodes (Hampson, 1914)
Nola pallescens Wileman & West
Nola promelaena Hampson
Nola pumila Snellen
Nola punctilineata Hampson
Nola quadriguttula Inoue
Nola taeniata Snellen
Nola tripuncta Wileman
Nolathripa lactaria (Graeser, 1892)
Paracrama angulata Sugi
Pisara thyrophora Hampson
Plotheia exacta (Semper, 1900)
Pseudoips sylphina Sugi
Pterogonaga chinensis Berio
Rhynchopalpus yoshimotoi Inoue
Risoba prominens Moore
Risoba tenuipoda (Strand, 1920)
Risoba vialis Moore
Selepa celtis Moore
Selepa discigera (Walker, 1862)
Siglophora ferreilutea Hampson, 1895
Siglophora sanguinolenta (Moore, 1888)
Sinna extrema (Walker, 1854)
Titulcia confictella Walker
Tyana falcata (Walker, 1866)
Tympanistes fusimargo Prout
Westermannia elliptica Bryk
Xenonola limbata (Wileman, 1915)

Notodontidae
Acmeshachia gigantea (Elwes, 1890)
Allodontoides tenebrosa (Wileman, 1910)
Benbowia takamukuana (Matsumura, 1925)
Besaia obliqua (Wileman, 1914)
Besaia inconspicua (Wileman, 1914)
Besaia nebulosa (Wileman, 1914)
Besaia sordida (Wileman, 1914)
Besaia crenelata (Swinhoe, 1896)
Betashachia angustipennis Matsumura, 1925
Cerura erminea (Matsumura, 1929)
Chadisra bipars Walker, 1862
Chadisra bipartita (Matsumura, 1925)
Cleapa latifascia Walker, 1855
Clostera anachoreta (Denis & Schiffermüller, 1775)
Clostera restitura (Walker, 1865)
Cnethodonta grisescens Matsumura, 1929
Curuzza ronkayorum (Schintlmeister, 2005)
Dudusa nobillis Walker, 1865
Dudusa sphingiformis Moore, 1872
Dudusa synopla Swinhoe, 1907
Ellida arcuata (Alphéraky, 1897)
Euhampsonia cristata (Butler, 1877)
Euhampsonia formosana (Matsumura, 1925)
Eushachia aurata Matsumura, 1925
Fentonia baibarana Matsumura, 1929
Fentonia macroparabolica Nakamura, 1973
Fentonia ocypete (Bremer, 1861)
Fentonia parabolica (Matsumura, 1925)
Formofentonia orbifer Matsumura, 1925
Gazalina purificata Sugi, 1993
Ginshachia elongata Matsumura, 1929
Harpyia longipennis (Matsumura, 1929)
Harpyia microsticta (Matsumura, 1927)
Hexafrenum leucodera (Nakamura, 1978)
Hexafrenum maculifer Matsumura, 1925
Higena trichosticha (Hampson, 1897)
Himeropteryx miraculosa Staudinger, 1887
Hiradonta angustipennis Nakatomi & Kishida, 1984
Hupodonta corticalis Butler, 1877
Hupodonta lignea Matsumura, 1919
Hyperaeschrella nigribasis (Hampson, [1893])
Liparopsis formosana Wileman, 1914
Lophocosma nigrilinea Matsumura, 1929
Lophocosma sarantuja Schintlmeister, 2005
Lophontosia fusca Okano, 1960
Mangea gemina Kishida & Kobayashi, 2004
Megaceramis lamprosticta Hampson, [1893]
Megashachia fulgurifera (Walker, 1858)
Mesophalera bruno Schintlmeister, 1997
Mesophalera sigmata (Butler, 1877)
Mesophalera speratus Schintlmeister, 2005
Metriaeschra apatela Nakamura, 1973
Micromelalopha baibarana Matsumura, 1929
Microphalera grisea Kishida, 1984
Mimopydna kishidai (Schintlmeister, 1989)
Neocerura liturata (Walker, 1855)
Neodrymonia taiwana Kobayashi, 2005
Neodrymonia anmashanensis Kishida, 1994
Neodrymonia marginalis (Matsumura, 1925)
Neodrymonia seriatopunctata (Matsumura, 1925)
Neodrymonia maculata (Moore, 1879)
Neopheosia fasciata (Moore, 1888)
Nephodonta taiwanensis Schintlmeister, 2005
Netria multispinae Schintlmeister, 2006
Netria viridescens Schintlmeister, 2006
Norracoides basinotata (Wileman, 1915)
Notodonta griseotincta Wileman, 1910
Pantherinus bipunctata (Okano, 1960)
Paracerura priapus (Schintlmeister, 1997)
Paracerura subrosea (Matsumura, 1927)
Paracerura tattakana (Matsumura, 1927)
Peridea graeseri Kishida, 1987
Peridea oberthueri (Staudinger, 1892)
Peridea sikkima Nakamura, 1973
Periergos antennae Schintlmeister, 2005
Periergos kamadena (Moore, 1865)
Periergos magna (Matsumura, 1920)
Phalera angustipennis (Matsumura, 1919)
Phalera assimilis (Bremer & Grey, 1852)
Phalera baoshinchangi Kobayashi & Kishida, 2007
Phalera combusta (Walker, 1855)
Phalera flavescens (Bremer & Grey, 1852)
Phalera obscura Wileman, 1910
Phalera takasagoensis Matsumura, 1919
Phalerodonta inclusa Okano, 1960
Pheosia rimosa Nakamura, 1973
Pheosiopsis linus Schintlmeister, 2005
Pheosiopsis lusciniola (Nakamura, 1973)
Pheosiopsis alishanensis Kishida, 1990
Pheosiopsis cinerea (Okano, 1959)
Phycidopsis albovittata Hampson, 1893
Pseudofentonia diluta (Wileman, 1910)
Pseudofentonia nakamurai (Sugi, 1990)
Pseudofentonia medioalbida Nakamura, 1973
Pseudofentonia nigrofasciata (Wileman, 1910)
Pseudofentonia argentifera (Moore, 1866)
Pseudofentonia plagiviridis (Moore, 1879)
Pseudosomera noctuiformis Bender & Steiniger, 1984
Ptilodon saturata (Walker, 1865)
Ptilophora rufula Kobayashi, 1994
Rachia lineata (Matsumura, 1925)
Rachiades albimaculata (Okano, 1958)
Ramesa albistriga (Moore, 1879)
Ramesa tosta Walker, 1855
Rosama ornata (Oberthür, 1884)
Saliocleta virgata (Wileman, 1914)
Semidonta basalis (Moore, 1865)
Shaka atrovittata (Matsumura, 1929)
Somera viridifusca Walker, 1855
Spatalia dives Oberthur, 1884
Spatalina ferruginosa (Moore, 1879)
Stauropus alternus Walker, 1855
Stauropus basalis Matsumura, 1934
Stauropus sikkimensis Okano, 1960
Stauropus teikichiana Matsumura, 1929
Syntypistis comatus (Leech, 1889)
Syntypistis cyanea (Leech, 1889)
Syntypistis lineata (Okano, 1960)
Syntypistis nigribasalis (Wileman, 1910)
Syntypistis perdix (Wileman, 1910)
Syntypistis pryeri (Leech, 1889)
Syntypistis subgeneris (Strand, 1916)
Syntypistis umbrosa (Matsumura, 1927)
Syntypistis viridipicta (Wileman, 1910)
Tarsolepis japonica Wileman & South, 1917
Tarsolepis taiwana Wileman, 1910
Tensha striatella Matsumura, 1925
Togaritensha curvilinea (Wileman, 1911)
Torigea formosana Nakamura, 1973
Uropyia meticulodina (Oberthur, 1884)
Vaneeckeia pallidifascia (Hampson, [1893])
Zaranga pannosa Moore, 1884

Oecophoridae
Ashinaga longimana Matsumura, 1929
Borkhausenia tyropis Meyrick, 1935
Casmara patrona Meyrick, 1925
Endrosis sarcitrella (Linnaeus, 1758)
Eulechria colonialis Meyrick, 1936
Formokamaga flavopicta Matsumura, 1931
Hofmannophila pseudospretella (Stainton, 1849)
Lamprystica purpurata Meyrick, 1914
Martyringa xeraula (Meyrick, 1910)
Oedematopoda ignipicta (Butler, 1881)
Pachyrhabda citrinacma Meyrick, 1936
Pedioxestis isomorpha Meyrick, 1932
Peracma pontiseca Meyrick, 1936
Periacma asaphochra Meyrick, 1931
Periacma conioxantha Meyrick, 1931
Periacma delegata Meyrick, 1914
Periacma lagophthalma Meyrick, 1932
Philobota syntropa Meyrick, 1931
Promalactis sakaiella (Matsumura, 1931)
Promalactis semantris (Meyrick, 1906)
Satrapia pyrotechnica Meyrick, 1935
Stathmopoda auriferalla (Walker, 1864)
Stathmopoda brachymochla Meyrick, 1937
Stathmopoda masinissa Meyrick, 1906
Stathmopoda melitripta Meyrick, 1933
Stathmopoda opticasis Meyrick, 1931
Stathmopoda porphyrantha Meyrick, 1913
Stathmopoda vertibrata Meyrick, 1914
Xestocasis iostrota (Meyrick, 1910)

Opostegidae
Pseudopostega epactaea (Meyrick, 1907)
Pseudopostega similantis Puples & Robinson, 1999

Palaeosetidae
Ogygioses caliginosa Issiki & Stringer, 1932
Ogygioses eurata Issiki & Stringer, 1932
Ogygioses issikii Davis et al., 1995

Pantheidae
Anacronicta horishana Matsumura, 1931
Anacronicta nitida (Butler, 1878)
Panthea grisea Wileman, 1910
Trichosea champa (Moore, 1879)
Trichosea diffusa Sugi, 1986
Trisuloides caerulea Bulter, 1889
Trisuloides sericea Bulter, 1881
Trisuloides subflava Wileman, 1911
Trisuloides taiwana Sugi, 1976

Peleopodidae
Acria xanthosaris Meyrick, 1909

Phaudidae
Phauda arikana Matsumura, 1927
Phauda flammans (Walker, 1854)
Phauda horishana Matsumura, 1927
Phauda mimica Strand, 1915
Phauda rubra Jordan, 1907
Phauda similis Hering, 1925
Phauda triadum (Walker, 1854)

Plutellidae
Anthonympha speciosa Moriuti, 1974
Caunaca sera (Meyrick, 1886)
Plutella xylostella (Linnaeus, 1758)
Tonza citrorrhoa Meyrick, 1905

Psychidae
Acanthopysche taiwana (Sonan, 1935)
Eumeta pryeri (Leech, 1888)
Eurukuttarus tatahashii (Sonan, 1935)
Kotochalia shirakii Sonan, 1935
Mahasena kotoensis Sonan, 1935
Mahasena oolona Sonan, 1935
Metisa saccharivosa (Sonan, 1935)
Psyche taiwana (Wileman & South, 1917)
Pteroma postica (Sonan, 1935)
Striglocyrbasia meguae Sugimoto & Saigusa, 2001
Tayalopsyche spinidomifera Sugimoto & Saigusa, 2002

Pterophoridae
Adaina microdactyla (Huebner, 1813)
Crombrugghia wahlbergi (Zeller, 1864)
Deuterocopus lophopteryx T. B. Fletcher, 1910
Deuterocopus socotranus Rebel, 1907
Deuterocopus triannulatus Meyrick, 1913
Diacrotricha fasciola Zeller, 1851
Exelastis pumilio (Zeller, 1873)
Hexadactylia trilobata T. B. Fletcher, 1910
Megalophipida defectalis (Walker, 1864)
Nippoptilia vitis (Sasaki, 1913)
Ochyrotica taiwanica Gielis, 1990
Ochyrotica yanoi Arenberger, 1988
Oidaematophorus kuwayamai (Matsumura, 1931)
Oidaematophorus lienigianus (Zeller, 1852)
Platyptilia chosokeiella Strand, 1922
Platyptilia citropleura Meyrick, 1908
Platyptilia farfarella (Zeller, 1867)
Platyptilia shirozui Yano, 1965
Platyptilia sythoffi Snellen, 1903
Pselnophorus japonicus Marumo, 1923
Pseudoxyroptila tectonica (Meyrick, 1914)
Pterophorus candidalis (Walker, 1864)
Pterophorus chosokeialis (Strand, 1922)
Pterophorus lacteipennis (Walker, 1864)
Pterophorus melanopoda (T. B. Fletcher, 1907)
Pterophorus niveodactyla (Pagenstecher, 1900)
Sphenarches anisodactyla (Walker, 1864)
Stenoptilia platanodes Meyrick, 1914
Stenoptiloides taprobanes (Felder & Rogenhofer, 1875)
Trichoptilus eochrodes Meyrick, 1935

Pyralidae
Achroia innotata (Walker, 1864)
Acrobasis bellulella (Ragonot, 1893)
Acrobasis epicrociella (Strand, 1919)
Addyme inductalis (Walker, 1863)
Aglossa dimidiata (Haworth, 1810)
Anagasta kuehniella (Zeller, 1879)
Ancylodes lapsalis (Walker, 1859)
Ancylosis maculifera Ragonot, 1870
Anerastia stramineipennis Strand, 1919
Apomyelois ceratoniae (Zeller, 1839)
Arippara indicator Walker, [1863]
Assara albicostalis Walker, 1863
Assara formosana Yoshiyasu, 1991
Assara funerella (Ragonot, 1901)
Aurana actiosella Walker, 1863
Aurana vinaceella (Inoue, 1963)
Bostra nanalis (Wileman, 1911)
Cadra cautella (Walker, 1863)
Cadra figulilella (Gregson, 1871)
Calguia defiguralis Walker, 1863
Calinipaxa validalis Walker, [1866]
Canthelea anpingialis (Strand, 1919)
Canthelea oegnusalis (Walker, 1859)
Canthelea taiwanalis (Shibuya, 1928)
Ceroprepes nigrolineatella Shibuya, 1927
Ceroprepes ophathalmicela (Christoph, 1881)
Citripestis sagittiferella (Moore, 1891)
Coenodomus dudgeoni Hampson, 1896
Commotria enervella Hampson, 1918
Comorta nigricostalis (Walker, 1863)
Conobathra aphidivora (Meyrick, 1934)
Conobathra birgitella Roesler, 1975
Corcyra brunnea West, 1931
Corcyra cephalonica (Stainton, 1866)
Craneophora ficki Christoph, 1881
Critonia phaeoneura Hampson, 1918
Cryptoblabes miserabilis (Strand, 1919)
Cryptoblabes proleucella Hampson, 1896
Curena costipunctata Shibuya, 1928
Dioryctria abietella [Denis & Schiffermüller], 1775
Dioryctria pryeri Ragonot, 1893
Dioryctria yiai Mutuura & Munroe, 1972
Doloessa viridis Zeller, 1848
Emmalocera anerastica (Snellen, 1880)
Emmalocera leucocincta (Walker, 1863)
Emmalocera miserabilis (Strand, 1919)
Emmalocera umbricostella Ragonot, 1888
Endotricha consocia (Bulter, 1879)
Endotricha costaemaculalis Christoph, 1881
Endotricha metacuralis Hampson, 1916
Endotricha olivacealis (Bremer, 1864)
Endotricha portialis Walker, 1859
Endotricha ruminalis (Walker, 1859)
Endotricha theonalis (Walker, 1859)
Endotricha wilemani West, 1931
Ephestia elutella (Hübner, [1796])
Epicrocis festivella Zeller, 1848
Epicrocis hilarella (Ragonot, 1888)
Epicrocis syntaractis (Turner, 1904)
Epilepia dentata (Matsumura & Shibuya, 1927)
Etiella behrii (Zeller, 1848)
Etiella hobsoni (Butler, 1880)
Etiella zinckenella (Treitschke, 1832)
Eurhodope basella Shibuya, 1928
Eurhodope karenkolla Shibuya, 1928
Eurhodope ohkunii Shibuya, 1928
Euzopherodes albicans Hampson, 1899
Galleria mellonella (Linnaeus, 1758)
Goya albivenella Ragonot, 1888
Goya claricostella Ragonot, 1888
Goya rosella (Hampson, 1896)
Herculia castanealis Shibuya, 1928
Herculia ignefimbrialis Hampson, 1906
Herculia jezoensis Shibuya, 1928
Herculia pelasgalis (Walker, 1859)
Herculia taiwanalis Shibuya, 1928
Hypsipyla formosana Shiraki, 1912
Hypsopygia mauritialis (Boisduval, 1833)
Hypsopygia postflava (Hampson, 1893)
Hypsopygia proboscidalis (Strand, 1919)
Hypsotropa formosalis Strand, 1919
Hypsotropa grassa Strand, 1919
Hypsotropa laterculella (Zeller, 1867)
Hypsotropa tripartalis Hampson, 1918
Jocara melanobasis (Hampson, 1906)
Jocara melanolopha (Hampson, 1912)
Lamida obscura (Moore, 1888)
Lamoria adaptella (Walker, 1863)
Lamoria inostentalis (Walker, 1863)
Lepidogma tripartita (Wileman & South, 1917)
Lixa productalis Heppner, 2005
Locastra muscosalis (Walker, [1866])
Loryma recusata (Walker, [1863])
Mampava bipunctella Ragonot, 1888
Medaniaria kosemponella (Strand, 1919)
Melanalis flavalis (Hampson, 1917)
Mimicia pseudolibatrix Heppner, 2005
Mussidia pectinicornella (Hampson, 1896)
Neohyalospila leuconeurella (Ragonot, 1888)
Nephopterix griseofusa (Wileman & South, 1919)
Oligochroa leucophaeella (Zeller, 1867)
Oncocera semirubella (Scopoli, 1763)
Orthaga centralis Wileman & South, 1917
Orthaga confusa Wileman & South, 1917
Orthaga edetalis Strand, 1919
Orthaga euadrusalis Walker, [1859]
Orthaga oliyacea (Warren, 1891)
Orthopygia anpingialis (Strand, 1919)
Orthopygia imbecilis (Moore, 1885)
Orthopygia nannodes (Bulter, 1879)
Orthopygia rudis (Moore, 1888)
Orthopygia sokutsensis (Strand, 1919)
Orthopygia suffusalis (Walker, [1866])
Orthopygia tenuis (Bulter, 1880)
Orybina flaviplaga (Walker, 1863)
Orybina plangonalis (Walker, 1859)
Paracme racilialis (Walker, 1859)
Pempelia ellenella (Roesler, 1975)
Pempelia maculata (Staudinger, 1876)
Pempeliella furella (Strand, 1919)
Phycita formosella (Wileman & South, 1918)
Phycita southi West, 1931
Phycita taiwanella Wileman & South, 1919
Phycitia anpingicola (Strand, 1919)
Picrogama semifoedalis (Walker, 1866)
Plodia interpunctella (Hübner, [1813])
Polycampsis longinasus Warren, 1896
Poujadia sepicostella Ragonot, 1888
Propachys nigrivena Walker, 1863
Ptyomaxia swinhoeella (Ragonot, 1893)
Pyralis centralis (Shibuya, 1928)
Pyralis costinotalis Hampson, 1917
Pyralis farinalis Linnaeus, 1758
Pyralis manihotalis Guenee, 1854
Pyralis pictalis (Curtis, 1834)
Pyralis prepialis (Hampson, 1903)
Pyralis regalis [Denis & Schiffermüller], 1775
Pyralis taihorinalis Shibuya, 1928
Rhinaphe apotomella (Meyrick, 1879)
Rhinaphe flavescentella (Hampson, 1901)
Scenedra orthotis (Meyrick, 1894)
Senachroia elongella Hampson, 1898
Spatulipalpia albistrialis Hampson, 1912
Stemmatophora albifimbrialis (Hampson, 1906)
Stemmatophora flavicaput Shibuya, 1928
Stemmatophora fuscibaslis (Snellen, 1880)
Stemmatophora mushana Shibuya, 1928
Sybrida discinota (Moore, 1866)
Sybrida inordinata Walker, 1865
Taiwanastrapometis kikuchii Shibuya, 1928
Tamraca torridalis (Lederer, 1863)
Tamraca torridalis Heppner, 2005
Tegulifera bicoloralis (Leech, 1889)
Tegulifera erythrolepia (Hampson, 1916)
Teliphasa albifusa (Hampson, 1896)
Teliphasa amica (Bulter, 1879)
Teliphasa baibarana (Shibuya, 1928)
Teliphasa nubilosa Moore, 1888
Teliphasa obliquilineata (Shibuya, 1928)
Teliphasa sakishimensis Inoue & Yamanaka, 1976
Termioptycha albifurcalis (Hampson, 1916)
Termioptycha margarita (Butler, 1879)
Tirathaba aperta (Strand, [1920])
Tirathaba mundella Walker, 1864
Toccolosida rubriceps Walker, 1863
Trebania flavifrontalis (Leech, 1889)
Volobilis biplaga Shibuya, 1928
Volobilis chloropterella (Hampson, 1896)
Volobilis ochridorsalis (Wileman & South, 1919)

Saturniidae
Actias heterogyna Kishida
Actias neidhoederi Ong & Yu
Actias selene C.Felder & R. Felder
Antheraea formosana Sonan
Antheraea pernyi (Guérin-Méneville, 1855)
Antheraea yamamai Inoue
Attacus atlas Villiard
Caligula japonica (Shiraki, 1913)
Caligula jonasi Sonan
Caligula thibeta Okano
Eriogyna pyretorum Watson
Loepa formosensis Mell, 1939
Loepa mirandula Yen, Naessig, Naumann & Brechlin, 2000
Rhodinia verecunda Inoue, 1984
Samia wangi Naumann & Peigler, 2001
Samia watsoni Matsumura

Schreckensteiniidae
Corsocasis coronias Meyrick, 1912

Scythrididae
Scythris sinensis (Felder & Rogenhofer, 1875)

Sesiidae
Chamanthedon shuisharyonis (Strand, 1917)
Chimaerosphecia aegerides Strand, 1916
Cyanophlebia mandarina Arita & Gorbunov, 2001
Cyanosesia flavicincta Arita & Gorbunov, 2002
Cyanosesia formosana Arita & Gorbunov, 2002
Entrichella issikii (Yano, 1960)
Entrichella trifasciatus (Yano, 1960)
Gasterostena funebris (Kallies & Arita, 2006)
Isothamnis prisciformis Arita & Gorbunov, 2001
Macroscelesia formosana Arita & Gorbunov, 2002
Melittia cristata Arita & Gorbunov, 2002
Melittia formosana Matsumura, 1911
Melittia sangaica Moore, 1877
Melittia taiwanensis Arita & Gorbunov, 2002
Milisipepsis taiwanensis Arita & Gorbunov, 2001
Nokona acaudata Arita & Gorbunov, 2001
Nokona chrysoides (Zukowsky, 1932)
Nokona formosana Arita & Gorbunov, 2001
Nokona inexpenctata Arita & Gorbunov, 2001
Nokona pilamicola (Strand, 1916)
Nokona powondrae (Dalla Torre, 1925)
Oligophlebiella polishana Strand, 1916
Paradoxecia similis Arita & Gorbunov, 2001
Paradoxecia taiwana Arita & Gorbunov, 2001
Paranthrenopsis polishana (Strand, 1916)
Parenthrenella formosicola (Strand, 1916)
Pennisetia kumaoides Arita & Gorbunov, 2001
Pennisetia unicingulata Arita & Gorbunov, 2001
Scasiba okinawana (Matsumura, 1931)
Scasiba taikanensis Matsumura, 1931
Synanthedon auritincta (Wileman & South, 1918)
Synanthedon mushana (Matsumura, 1931)
Taikona matsumurai Arita & Gorbunov, 2001
Teinoarsina longitarsa Arita & Gorbunov, 2002
Teinotarsina flavicincta Arita & Gorbunov
Tinthia cuprealis (Moore, 1877)
Toleria ilana Arita & Gorbunov, 2001
Trichocerota formosana Arita & Gorbunov, 2002

Sphingidae
Acherontia lachesis (Fabricius, 1798)
Acherontia styx Butler, 1876
Acosmerycoides leucocrapis (Hampson, 1910)
Acosmeryx anceus Rothschild & Jordan, 1903
Acosmeryx castanea Rothschild & Jordan, 1903
Acosmeryx formosana (Matsumura, 1927)
Acosmeryx naga (Moore, 1858)
Agrius convolvuli (Linnaeus, 1758)
Amblypterus mansoni (Matsumura, 1930)
Ambulyx japonica (Okano, 1959)
Ambulyx kuangtungensis (Mell, 1922)
Ambulyx ochracea Butler, 1885
Ambulyx semiplacida Inoue, 1989
Ambulyx sericeipennis (Okano, 1959)
Ampelophaga rubiginosa Kitching & Cadiou, 2000
Angonyx testacea (Walker, 1856)
Callambulyx poecillus Clark, 1935
Cechenena lineosa (Walker, 1856)
Cechenena minor (Butler, 1875)
Cechenena subangustata Rothschild, 1920
Cephonodes hylas (Linnaeus, 1771)
Clanis bilineata Gehlen, 1941
Cypa pallens Jordan, 1931
Cypoides chinensis (Rothschild & Jordan, 1903)
Dahira rubiginosa Moore, 1888
Dahira taiwana (Brechlin, 1998)
Daphnis hypothous (Cramer, 1780)
Daphnis nerii (Linnaeus, 1758)
Degmaptera mirabilis (Rothschild, 1894)
Deilephila elpenor (Linnaeus, 1758)
Dolbina inexacta (Walker, 1856)
Gnathothlibus erotus (Cramer, 1777)
Hemaris affinis (Bremer, 1861)
Hippotion celerio (Linnaeus, 1758)
Hippotion rosetta Swinhoe, 1892
Hippotion velox (Fabricius, 1793)
Hyles livornica (Esper, 1780)
Langia zenzeroides Clark, 1936
Lepchina obliquifascia (Matsumura, 1927)
Leucophlebia lineata Westwood, 1847
Macroglossum belis (Linnaeus, 1758)
Macroglossum bombylans (Boisduval, 1875)
Macroglossum corythus (Butler, 1875)
Macroglossum faro (Cramer, 1779)
Macroglossum fritzei Rothschild & Jordan, 1903
Macroglossum heliophila (Boisduval, 1875)
Macroglossum insipida Butler, 1875
Macroglossum mediovitta Rothschild & Jordan, 1903
Macroglossum mitchelli (Butler, 1875)
Macroglossum neotroglodytus Kitching & Cadiou, 2000
Macroglossum passalus (Drury, 1773)
Macroglossum poecilum Rothschild & Jordan, 1903
Macroglossum pyrrhosticta (Butler, 1875)
Macroglossum saga (Butler, 1878)
Macroglossum sitiene (Walker, 1856)
Macroglossum stellatarum (Linnaeus, 1758)
Macroglossum sylvia (Boisduval, 1875)
Macroglossum ungues Yen, Kitching & Tzen 2003
Marumba cristata Clark, 1937
Marumba dryas (Walker, 1856)
Marumba gaschkewitschii Clark, 1937
Marumba saishiuana Matsumura, 1927
Marumba sperchius Clark, 1937
Meganoton analis Clark, 1937
Neogurelca himachala (Butler, 1876)
Neogurelca hyas (Walker, 1856)
Parum colligata (Walker, 1856)
Pentateucha inouei Owada & Brechlin, 1997
Pergesa actea (Cramer, 1779)
Phyllosphingia dissimilis Clark, 1937
Polyptychus chinensis Rothschild & Jordan
Psilogramma increta (Walker, 1865)
Psilogramma menephron (Cramer, 1780)
Rhagastis binoculata Matsumura, 1909
Rhagastis castor Clark, 1925
Rhagastis mongoliana (Butler, 1875)
Rhagastis velata (Walker, 1866)
Smerinthulus perversa Inoue, 1990
Sphinx formosana Riotte, 1970
Theretra alecto (Linnaeus, 1758)
Theretra boisduvalii (Bugnion, 1839)
Theretra clotho (Drury, 1773)
Theretra japonica (Boisduval, 1869)
Theretra latreillii (Walker, 1856)
Theretra nessus (Drury, 1773)
Theretra oldenlandiae (Fabricius, 1775)
Theretra rhesus (Boisduval, 1875)
Theretra sihetensis (Walker, 1856)
Theretra suffusa (Walker, 1856)

Thyrididae
Addaea polyphoralis (Walker, 1866)
Banisia fenestrifera Walker, 1863
Banisia owadai Inoue, 1976
Calindoea polygraphalis (Walker, [1866])
Canaea ryukyuensis Inoue, 1965
Glanycus insolitus Walker, 1855
Glanycus tricolor Moore, 1879
Herimba atkinsoni Moore, 1879
Hypolamprus emblicalis Moore, 1888
Hypolamprus kamadenalis (Strand, 1920)
Hypolamprus marginepunctalis (Leech, 1889)
Hypolamprus reticulatus Wileman, 1916
Hypolamprus ypsilon (Warren, 1899)
Pyralioides aurea (Butler, 1881)
Pyralioides sinuosus (Warren, 1896)
Rhodoneura erecta Leech, 1889
Rhodoneura hamifera (Moore, 1888)
Rhodoneura lactiguttata Hampson, 1920
Rhodoneura vittula Guenee, 1877
Sonagara strigipennis Moore, 1882
Strigulina burgesi Gaede, 1922
Strigulina mediofascia Swinhoe, 1906
Strigulina scitaria (Walker, 1862)
Strigulina venia Whalley, 1976
Thyris alex Buchsbaum et al., 2006

Tineidae
Ceratosticha leptodeta Meyrick, 1935
Cimitra seclusella Walker, 1864
Coryptilum rutilellum (Walker, 1869)
Dacrypohanes canastra Meyrick, 1907
Erechthias atririvis (Meyrick, 1931)
Erechthias minuscula (Walsingham, 1897)
Eudarcia defluescens (Meyrick, 1934)
Euplocamus tanylopha Meyrick, 1932
Gerontha dracuncula Meyrick, 1928
Haplotinea subochraceella (Walsingham, 1886)
Harmaclona tepheantha (Meyrick, 1939)
Machaeropteris petalacma Meyrick, 1932
Monopis monochella (Huebner, 1796)
Morophaga bucephala (Snellen, 1884)
Morophaga formosana Robinson, 1986
Morphophagoides moriutii Robinson, 1986
Mothogenes citrocrana Meyrick, 1932
Opogona bicolorella (Matsumura, 1931)
Opogona flavofasciata (Stainton, 1859)
Opogona leucodeta Meyrick, 1914
Opogona loxophanta Meyrick, 1936
Opogona nipponica Stringer, 1930
Opogona phaeadelpha Meyrick, 1934
Opogona protographa Meyrick, 1911
Opogona stathmota Meyrick, 1911
Pachypsaltis isolens Meyrick, 1914
Psychoides phaedrospora (Meyrick, 1935)
Sapheneutis cineracea Meyrick, 1914
Setomorpha rutella Zeller, 1852
Spatularia mimosae (Stainton, 1859)
Tinea argyrocentra Meyrick, 1934
Tinea croniopa Meyrick, 1934
Tinea fictrix Meyrick, 1914
Tinea limenitis Meyrick, 1935
Tinea metathyris Meyrick, 1935
Tinea nigrofasciata Shiraki, 1913
Tinea pellionella Linnaeus, 1758
Tineola bisselliella (Hummel, 1823)
Tineovertex melanochrysus (Meyrick, 1911)
Tinissa indica Robinson, 1976
Wegneria cerodelta (Meyrick, 1911)

Tineodidae
Cenoloba argochalca Meyrick, 1939

Tortricidae
Acanthoclita balanoptycha (Meyrick, 1910)
Acanthoclita iridorphna (Meyrick, 1936)
Acleris alnivora Oku, 1956
Acleris atayalicana Kawabe, 1989
Acleris auricaput Razowski, 1971
Acleris bununa Kawabe, 1989
Acleris cristana Denis & Schiffermüller, 1775
Acleris enitescens (Meyrick, 1912)
Acleris extensana (Walker, 1863)
Acleris formosae Razowski, 1964
Acleris gatesclarki Kawabe, 1992
Acleris hohuanshana Kawabe, 1989
Acleris japonica (Walsingham, 1900)
Acleris lacordairana (Duponchel, 1836)
Acleris loxoscia (Meyrick, 1907)
Acleris lucipara Razowski, 1964
Acleris luoyingensis Kawabe, 1992
Acleris nakajimai Kawabe, 1992
Acleris placata (Meyrick, 1912)
Acleris pulchella Kawabe, 1964
Acleris pulcherrima Razowski, 1971
Acleris rantaizana Razowski, 1966
Acleris submaccana (Filipjev, 1962)
Acleris taiwana Kawabe, 1992
Acleris tremewani Razowski, 1964
Acleris tsuifengana Kawabe, 1992
Acleris ulmicola (Meyrick, 1930)
Acleris venatana Kawabe, 1992
Acleris yasutoshii Kawabe, 1985
Acroclita anachastopa Meyrick, 1934
Acroclita catharotorna Meyrick, 1935
Acroclita corinthia Meyrick, 1912
Adoxophyes fasciculana (Walker, 1866)
Adoxophyes orana (Fischer von Röslerstamm, 1834)
Adoxophyes privatana (Walker, 1863)
Aethes cnicana (Westwood, 1854)
Apeleptera semnodryas (Meyrick, 1936)
Apotomis platycremna (Meyrick, 1935)
Archilobesia formosana Diakonoff, 1973
Archips davisi Kawabe, 1989
Archips formosanus (Kawabe, 1968)
Archips paredreus (Meyrick, 1931)
Archips paterata (Meyrick, 1914)
Archips sayonae Kawabe, 1985
Archips seminubilus (Meyrick, 1929)
Archips shibatai Kawabe, 1985
Archips taichunganus Razowski, 2000
Archips taiwanensis Kawabe, 1985
Argyrotoxa metallastra Meyrick, 1933
Arotrophora gilligani Razowski, 2009
Asymmetrarcha xenopa Diakonoff, 1973
Aterpia microplaca (Meyrick, 1912)
Bactra cerata (Meyrick, 1909)
Bactra copidotis Meyrick, 1909
Bactra furfurana Haworth, 1811
Bactra hostilis Diakonoff, 1956
Bactra leucogama Meyrick, 1909
Bactra minima Meyrick, 1909
Bactra venosana (Zeller, 1847)
Bubonoxena spirographa Diakonoff, 1968
Capua changi Kawabe, 1989
Celypha orthocosma (Meyrick, 1931)
Cephalophyes cyanura (Meyrick, 1909)
Cerace myriopa Meyrick, 1922
Cerace stipatana Walker, 1863
Cerace xanthocosma Diakonoff, 1950
Chiraps alloica (Diakonoff, 1948)
Choristoneura issikii Yasuda, 1962
Choristoneura murinana (Hübner, 1796–99)
Clepsis hohaunshanensis Kawabe, 1985
Clepsis owadai Kawabe, 1992
Clepsis provocata (Meyrick, 1912)
Clepsis razowskii Kawabe, 1992
Cnesteboda celligera Meyrick, 1918
Cnesteboda davidsoni Razowski, 2000
Cochylidia altivaga Diakonoff, 1976
Costosa rhodantha (Meyrick, 1907)
Crocidosema lantana Busck, 1910
Crocidosema plebejana Zeller, 1847
Cryptaspasma helota (Meyrick, 1905)
Cryptophlebia amblyopa Clarke, 1976
Cryptophlebia ombrodelta (Lower, 1898)
Cryptophlebia repletana (Walker, 1863)
Cydia haemostacta (Meyrick, 1931)
Cydia leucostoma (Meyrick, 1912)
Cydia malesana (Meyrick, 1920)
Cydia notanthes (Meyrick, 1936)
Dactylioglypha tonica (Meyrick, 1909)
Diactenis youngi Razowski, 2000
Dicephalarcha dependens (Meyrick, 1922)
Dicephalarcha sicca Diakonoff, 1973
Dichrorampha sugii Kawabe, 1989
Dichrorampha tayulingensis Kawabe, 1986
Diplocalyptis operosa (Meyrick, 1908)
Diplocalyptis shanpingana Razowski, 2000
Dudua aprobola (Meyrick, 1886)
Dudua hemigrapta (Meyrick, 1931)
Dudua hesperialis Walker, 1864
Dudua ptarmicopa (Meyrick, 1936)
Ebodina elephantodes (Meyrick, 1938)
Enarmonodes aeologlypta (Meyrick, 1936)
Endothenia banausopis (Meyrick, 1938)
Endothenia remigera Falkovitsh, 1970
Epiblema alishana Kawabe, 1986
Epiblema foenella (Linnaeus, 1758)
Epinotia bicolor (Walsingham, 1900)
Epinotia melanosticta (Wileman & Stringer, 1929)
Epinotia rasdorniana (Christoph, 1881)
Epinotia rubricana Kuznetsov, 1968
Epinotia salicicolana Kuznetsov, 1968
Epinotia shikokuensis Kawabe, 1984
Epinotia toshimai (Kawabe, 1978)
Eucoenogenes japonica Kawabe, 1978
Eucosma melanoneura Meyrick, 1912
Eucosma pentagonaspis Meyrick, 1931
Eucosma threnodes (Meyrick, 1905)
Eudemis gyrotis (Meyrick, 1909)
Eudemopsis brevis Liu & Bai, 1982
Eupoecilia ambiguella (Hübner, 1796)
Eupoecilia kobeana Razowski, 1986
Eupoecilia wegneri (Diakonoff, 1941)
Eurydoxa indigena Yasuda, 1978
Eurydoxa tetrakore (Wileman & Stringer, 1929)
Gatesclarkeana idia Diakonoff, 1973
Gatesclarkeana senior Diakonoff, 1966
Geogepa malacotorna (Meyrick, 1931)
Geogepa nigropunctata Kawabe, 1985
Geogepa pedaliota (Meyrick, 1936)
Geogepa promiscua Razowski, 1977
Gephyroneura hemidoxa (Meyrick, 1907)
Gibberifera glaciata (Meyrick, 1907)
Gnorismoneura exulis Issiki & Stringer, 1932
Grapholita delineana (Walker, 1863)
Grapholita molesta (Busck, 1916)
Gypsonoma attrita Falkovitsh, 1965
Hedya iophaea (Meyrick, 1912)
Hedya vicinana (Ragonot, 1894)
Heleanna melanomochla (Meyrick, 1936)
Hendecaneura axiotima (Meyrick, 1937)
Hermenias pilishina Razowski, 2000
Homona coffearia (Nietner, 1811)
Homona magnanima Diakonoff, 1948
Hoshinoa issikii Yasuda, 1962
Hoshinoa longicellana (Walsingham, 1900)
Hystrichoscelus spathanum Walsingham, 1900
Isodemis proxima Razowski, 2000
Isodemis serpentinana (Walker, 1863)
Isotenes inae Diakonoff, 1948
Kennelia albifacies (Walsingham, 1900)
Kennelia protocyma (Meyrick, 1936)
Lasiognatha mormopa (Meyrick, 1906)
Lobesia aeolopa Meyrick, 1907
Lobesia ambigua Diakonoff, 1954
Lobesia atsushii Bae, 1993
Lobesia cunninghamiacola (Liu & Bai, 1977)
Lobesia genialis (Meyrick, 1912)
Lobesia lithogonia Diakonoff, 1954
Lobesia monotana Diakonoff, 1954
Lobesia postica Bae, 1993
Lobesia virulenta Bae & Komai, 1991
Loboschiza koenigana (Fabricius, 1775)
Lopharcha angustior Diakonoff, 1941
Lumaria minuta (Walsingham, 1900)
Matsumuraeses falcana (Walsingham, 1900)
Matsumuraeses felix Diakonoff, 1972
Matsumuraeses phaseoli (Matsumura, 1900)
Meridemis bathymorpha Diakonoff, 1976
Meridemis invalidana (Walker, 1863)
Neocalyptis affinisana (Walker, 1863)
Neocalyptis taiwana Razowski, 2000
Neocalyptis tricensa (Meyrick, 1912)
Neohermenias melanocopa (Meyrick, 1912)
Neopotamia cryptocosma Kawabe, 1992
Neopotamia formosa Kawabe, 1989
Neopotamia punctata Kawabe, 1989
Neopotamia rubra Kawabe, 1992
Notocelia kurosawai Kawabe, 1986
Olethreutes orthocosma (Meyrick, 1931)
Olethreutes perdicoptera (Wileman & Stringer, 1929)
Olethreutes sideroxyla (Meyrick, 1931)
Olethreutes trichosoma (Meyrick, 1914)
Pandemis inouei Kawabe, 1968
Parepisimia catharota (Meyrick, 1928)
Pelatea assidua (Meyrick, 1914)
Peridaedala litigosa (Meyrick, 1912)
Phaecadophora acutana Walsingham, 1900
Phaecadophora fimbriata Walsingham, 1900
Phaecasiophora amoena Kawabe, 1986
Phaecasiophora attica (Meyrick, 1907)
Phaecasiophora caryosema (Meyrick, 1931)
Phaecasiophora cornigera Diakonoff, 1959
Phaecasiophora fernaldana Walsingham, 1900
Phaulacantha acyclica Diakonoff, 1973
Phricanthes flexilineana (Walker, 1863)
Phtheochroa zophocosma (Meyrick, 1928)
Phyacionia dativa Heinrich, 1928
Piercea minimana (Caradja, 1916)
Proschistis marmaropa (Meyrick, 1907)
Pseudacroclita hapalaspis (Meyrick, 1931)
Retinia cristata (Walsingham, 1900)
Rhodacra pyrrhocrossa (Meyrick, 1912)
Rhopobota bicolor Kawabe, 1989
Rhopobota unipunctana (Haworth, 1811)
Schoenotenini discreta Diakonoff, 1941
Scoliographa hoplista (Meyrick, 1927)
Scotiophyes faeculosa (Meyrick, 1928)
Semniotes abrupta Diakonoff, 1973
Semnostola mystica Diakonoff, 1959
Sorolopha aeolochlora (Meyrick, 1916)
Sorolopha bryana (Felder & Rogenhofer, 1874)
Sorolopha elaeodes (Lower, 1908)
Sorolopha herbifera (Meyrick, 1909)
Sorolopha liochlora (Meyrick, 1914)
Sorolopha muscida (Wileman & Stringer, 1929)
Sorolopha plinthograpta (Meyrick, 1931)
Sorolopha plumboviridis Diakonoff, 1973
Sorolopha rubescens Diakonoff, 1973
Sorolopha semiculta (Meyrick, 1909)
Sorolopha sphaerocopa (Meyrick, 1929)
Spatalistis aglaoxantha Meyrick, 1924
Spatalistis christophana (Walsingham, 1900)
Spilonota algosa Meyrick, 1912
Spilonota meleanocopa Meyrick, 1912
Statherotis discana (Felder & Rogenhofer, 1874)
Statherotis leucaspis (Meyrick, 1902)
Statherotis olenarcha (Meyrick, 1931)
Statherotmantis pictana (Kuznetsov, 1969)
Statherotoxys hedraea (Meyrick, 1905)
Strepsicrates rhothia (Meyrick, 1910)
Taiwancylis cladosium Razowski, 2000
Temnolopha matura Diakonoff, 1973
Terthreutis bulligera Meyrick, 1928
Terthreutis dousticta Wileman & Stringer, 1929
Tetramoera schistaceana (Snellen, 1890)
Thaumatographa mesostigmatis Diakonoff, 1977
Theorica lamyra (Meyrick, 1911)
Tosirips perpulchrana (Kennel, 1901)
Trymalitis margarias Meyrick, 1905
Ukamenia sapporensis (Matsumura, 1931)
Zeiraphera fulvomixtana Kawabe, 1974
Zeiraphera hohuanshana Kawabe, 1986
Zeiraphera taiwana Kawabe, 1986

Uraniidae
Acropteris leptaliata (Guenee, 1857)
Chundana emarginata (Hampson, 1891)
Dysaethria cretacea (Butler, 1881)
Dysaethria erasaria (Christoph, 1881)
Dysaethria flavistriga (Warren, 1901)
Dysaethria formosibia (Strand, 1916)
Dysaethria fulvihamata (Hampson, 1912)
Dysaethria quadricaudata (Walker, 1861)
Dysaethria suisharyonis (Strand, 1916)
Dyseathria conflictaria (Walker, 1861)
Dyseathria obscuraria (Moore, 1887)
Epiplema arcuata Warren, 1896
Epiplema pygmeata (Warren, 1897)
Epiplema strigulicosta Strand, 1916
Europlema conchiferata (Moore, 1887)
Europlema desistaria (Walker, 1861)
Europlema nivosaria (Walker, 1866)
Europlema quadripunctata (Wileman, 1916)
Micronia aculeata Guenee, 1857
Monobolodes pernigrata (Warren, 1896)
Monobolodes prunaria (Moore, 1887)
Monobolodes simulans (Butler, 1889)
Oroplema oyamana (Walker, 1866)
Oroplema plagifera (Butler, 1881)
Phazaca alikangensis (Strand, 1916)
Phazaca kosemponicola (Strand, 1916)
Phazaca theclatus (Guenee, 1857)
Pseudomicronia advocataria (Walker, 1861)
Pterotosoma castanea (Warren, 1896)
Warreniplema fumicosta (Warren, 1896)

Xyloryctidae
Cynicorates tachytoma Meyrick, 1935
Metathrinca tsugensis (Kearfott, 1910)
Rhizosthenes falciformis Meyrick, 1935

Yponomeutidae
Argyresthia ornatipennella Moriuti, 1974
Argyresthia taiwanensis Moriuti, 1968
Kessleria insulella Moriuti, 1977
Lycophantis chalcoleuca Meyrick, 1914
Lycophantis elongata Moriuti, 1963
Saridoscelis sphenias Meyrick, 1894
Sympetalistis petrographa Meyrick, 1935
Teinoptila guttella Moriuti, 1977
Thecobathra basilobata Fan, Jin & Li, 2008
Thecobathra kappa (Moriuti, 1963)
Thecobathra lambda (Moriuti, 1963)
Thecobathra partinuda Fan, Jin & Li, 2008
Xyrosaris luchneuta Meyrick, 1918
Yponomeuta meguronis (Matsumura, 1931)

Zygaenidae
Achelura sanguifasciata Horie, 1994
Agalope formosana Matsumura, 1927
Agalope pica (Wileman, 1910)
Agalope trimacula Matsumura, 1927
Agalope wangi Owada, 1992
Amesia sanguiflua Hampson, 1919
Arbudas leno (Swinhoe, 1900)
Arbudas submacula (Wileman, 1910)
Artona flavipuncta Hampson, 1900
Artona hainana Butler, 1876
Artona martini Efetov, 1997
Balataea taiwana Wileman, 1911
Campylotes altissimus Elwes, 1890
Campylotes maculosa Wileman, 1910
Chalcosia diana Butler, 1877
Chalcosia formosana Inoue, 1991
Chalcosia thaivana owadai Wang, 1999
Chalcosia thaivana thaivana Jordan, 1907
Chrysartona stipata (Walker, 1854)
Clelea formosana Strand, 1915
Erasmia pulchella Butler, 1889
Erasmiphlebohecta picturata (Wileman, 1910)
Eterusia aedea Jordan, 1907
Eterusia taiwana (Wileman, 1911)
Formozygaena shibatai Inoue, 1987
Gynautocera rubriscutellata Hering, 1922
Histia flabellicornis Hering, 1922
Hysteroscene extravagans Haring, 1925
Hysteroscene hyalina (Leech, 1889)
Illiberis arisana (Matsumura, 1927)
Illiberis formosensis Strand, 1915
Illiberis horni (Strand, 1915)
Illiberis laeva Puengeler, 1914
Illiberis phacusana Strand, 1915
Illiberis silvestris (Strand, 1915)
Illiberis taiwana Efetov, 1997
Illiberis yeni Efetov, 1997
Inouela formosensis Efetov, 1999
Milleria adalifa Strand, 1917
Morionia sciara Jordan, 1910
Neochalcosia remota (Walker, 1854)
Pidorus atratus Butler, 1877
Pidorus gemina (Walker, 1854)
Pollanista inconspicua Strand, 1915
Pryeria sinica Moore, 1877
Pseudoinope fusca (Leech, 1889)
Rhodopsona marginata (Wileman, 1910)
Rhodopsona rutila Jordan, 1910
Soritia azurea Yen, 2003
Soritia choui Yen & Yang, 1998
Soritia strandi Kishida, 1995

See also 
List of butterflies of Taiwan

References

External links 
TaibNet - Catalogue of Life in Taiwan

 Moths
Moths
Taiwan
Taiwan